= List of banned substances in Major League Baseball =

Major League Baseball's drug policy prohibits players from using, possessing, selling, facilitating the sale of, distributing, or facilitating the distribution of any Drug of Abuse and/or Steroid. Any and all drugs or substances listed under Schedule II of the Controlled Substances Act are considered drugs of abuse covered by the Program. Players who require prescription medication can still use it with a "Therapeutic Use Exemption" granted by MLB.

In December 2019, MLB removed cannabinoids and added cocaine and opiates to its list of Drugs of Abuse. However, players were told that they could still be suspended for possessing or selling cannabis, or driving under the influence of cannabis.

== List of banned substances (not exhaustive) ==
=== Drugs of abuse ===
1. Synthetic cannabinoids
2. Cocaine
3. LSD
4. Opiates (e.g., fentanyl, oxycodone, heroin, codeine, and morphine)
5. Amphetamines (e.g., MDMA (Ecstasy), MDA, Meth)
6. "Bath salts" (e.g., cathinone, synthetic cathinone, MDPV)
7. GHB
8. Phencyclidine (PCP)

=== Performance enhancing substances (steroids, growth factors, hormone modulators, masking agents) ===
1. Androstanediol
2. Androstanedione
3. Androstatrienedione (ATD)
4. Androstanolone
5. Androstenediol
6. Androstenedione
7. Androst-2-en-17-one (2-androstenone, delta-2)
8. Androsterone
9. Bolandiol
10. Bolasterone
11. Boldenone
12. Boldione
13. Calusterone
14. Clenbuterol
15. Clostebol (chlortestosterone)
16. Danazol
17. Dehydrochloromethyltestosterone (DHCMT, turinabol)
18. Dehydroepiandrosterone (DHEA)
19. Desoxy-methyltestosterone (DMT, madol)
20. Dihydrotestosterone
21. Drostanolone
22. Epiandrosterone
23. Epi-dihydrotestosterone
24. Epitestosterone
25. Ethylestrenol
26. Fluoxymesterone
27. Formebolone
28. Furazabol
29. Gestrinone
30. Halodrol
31. 4-Hydroxytestosterone
32. 7-Keto-DHEA
33. Mestanolone
34. Mesterolone
35. Methandienone
36. Methandriol
37. Methasterone (superdrol)
38. Methenolone
39. Methylclostebol
40. Methyldienolone
41. Methylnortestosterone
42. Methylstenbolone (ultradrol, m-sten)
43. Methyltestosterone
44. Methyltrienolone (metribolone)
45. Mibolerone
46. Nandrolone
47. Norbolethone
48. Norandrostenediol
49. Norandrostenedione
50. Norandrosterone
51. Norbolethone (genabol)
52. Norclostebol
53. Norethandrolone
54. Noretiocholanolone
55. Oxabolone
56. Oxandrolone
57. Oxymesterone
58. Oxymetholone
59. Prasterone (DHEA)
60. Promagnon
61. Prostanozol
62. Quinbolone
63. Selective androgen receptor modulators (SARMs)
64. Stanozolol
65. Stenbolone
66. Testosterone
67. Tetrahydrogestrinone
68. Tibolone
69. Trenbolone
70. Zeranol
71. Zilpaterol
72. Any salt, ester, or ether of a drug or substance listed above
73. Human growth hormone (hGH), including all fragments (e.g., AOD9604, hGH fragment 176-191) and releasing factors including GHRHs (e.g., CJC-1295, sermorelin, tesamorelin), GHSs (e.g., ghrelin and its mimetics (e.g., anamorelin, ibutamoren (MK-0677), ipamorelin), and peptides (e.g., alexamorelin, GHRP-2 (pralmorelin), GHRP-6, hexarelin)
74. Insulin-like growth factor (IGF-1), including all isomers of IGF-1 (mechano growth factors, thymosin beta-4)
75. Gonadotrophins (hCG), including LH and hCG
76. Corticotrophins, including releasing factors (corticorelin)
77. Erythropoiesis stimulating agents, including (erythropoietin (EPO), darbepoetin (dEPO), hematide, methoxy polyethylene glycol-epoetin beta (CERA))
78. Aromatase inhibitors, including anastrozole, androstatrienedione (ATD), androstenetrione (6-OXO), aminoglutethimide, arimistane, exemestane, formestane, letrozole, and testolactone
79. Selective estrogen receptor modulators (SERMs), including bazedoxifene, ospemifene, raloxifen, tamoxifen, and toremifen
80. Other Anti-estrogens, including clomiphene, cyclofenil, and fulvestrant
81. Myostatin modifying agents, including myostatin inhibitors (e.g., follistatin)
82. Metabolic modifying agents, including Peroxisome Proliferator Activated Receptor δ (PPARδ) agonists (GW1516, GW501516, GW0742), AMP-activated protein kinase (AMPK) activators (AICAR, SR9009 (stenabolic)), meldonium (mildronate), trimetazidine
83. HIF stabilizers, including roxadustat (FG-4592), molidustat (BAY 85-3934), FG-2216, BAY 87-2243.
84. Masking agents, including diuretics, desmopressin, probenecid, plasma expanders (e.g., intravenous administration of albumin, dextran, hydroxyethyl starch and mannitol)
85. Diuretics include acetazolamide, amiloride, bumetanide, canrenone, chlorthalidone, etacrynic acid, furosemide, indapamide, metolazone, spironolactone, thiazides (e.g., bendroflumethiazide, chlorothiazide, hydrochlorothiazide), triamterene, vaptans
86. Gene doping, the use of nucleic acids that may alter genome sequences and/or gene expression, including gene editing, gene silencing, gene transfer, genetically modified cells

=== Stimulants ===
1. Adrafinil
2. Amfepramone (diethylproprion)
3. Amiphenazole
4. Amphetamine
5. Amphetaminil
6. Armodafinil
7. Benfluorex
8. Benzphetamine
9. Benzylpiperazine
10. Bromantan
11. Carphedon
12. Cathine (norpseudoephedrine)
13. Chloroamphetamine
14. Clobenzorex
15. Cropropamide
16. Crotetamide
1. Dimethylamylamine
2. Dimethylamphetamine
3. 1,3-Dimethylbutylamine (DMBA)
4. Ephedrine
5. Etamivan
6. Ethylamphetamine
7. Etilefrine
8. Famprofazone
9. Fenbutrazate
10. Fencamfamine
11. Fenethylline
12. Fenfluramine
13. Fenproporex
14. Furfenorex
15. Heptaminol
16. Isometheptene
17. Levmetamphetamine
18. Lisdexamphetamine
19. Meclofenoxate
20. Mefenorex
21. Mephentermine
22. Mesocarb
23. Methylephedrine
24. Methylhexaneamine (dimethylamylamine, DMAA)
25. Methylphenidate
26. Modafinil
27. N,alpha-Diethylphenylethylamine (N,a-DEPEA)
28. N-ethyl-1-phenyl-2-butanamine
29. Nikethamide
30. Norfenefrine
31. Norfenfluramine
32. Octodrine (DMHA)
33. Octopamine
34. Oxilofrine
35. Parahydroxyamphetamine
36. Pemoline
37. Pentetrazol
38. Phendimetrazine
39. Phenethylamine
40. Phenmetrazine
41. Phenpromethamine
42. Phentermine
43. Prenylamine
44. Prolintane
45. Propylhexedrine
46. Pyrovalerone
47. Selegiline
48. Sibutramine
49. Strychnine
50. Tuaminoheptane

Prohibited Substances may be added to the list only by the unanimous vote of HPAC, provided that the addition by the federal government of a substance to Schedule I, II, or III will automatically result in that substance being added to the list.
