= Appetite stimulant =

Substance that increases appetite

An orexigenic, or appetite stimulant, is a drug, hormone, or compound that increases appetite and may induce hyperphagia. This can be a medication or a naturally occurring neuropeptide hormone, such as ghrelin, orexin or neuropeptide Y, which increases hunger and therefore enhances food consumption. Usually appetite enhancement is considered an undesirable side effect of certain drugs as it leads to unwanted weight gain, but sometimes it can be beneficial and a drug may be prescribed solely for this purpose, especially when the patient is suffering from severe appetite loss or muscle wasting due to cystic fibrosis, anorexia, old age, cancer or AIDS. There are several widely used drugs which can cause a boost in appetite, including tricyclic antidepressants (TCAs), tetracyclic antidepressants, natural or synthetic cannabinoids, first-generation antihistamines, most antipsychotics and many steroid hormones. In the United States, no hormone or drug has currently been approved by the FDA specifically as an orexigenic, with the exception of dronabinol, which received approval for HIV/AIDS-induced anorexia only.

== List of orexigenics ==
- 5-HT_{2C} receptor antagonists/inverse agonists — mirtazapine, olanzapine, quetiapine, amitriptyline, cyproheptadine, lurasidone
- H_{1} receptor antagonists/inverse agonists — mirtazapine, olanzapine, quetiapine, amitriptyline, cyproheptadine, pizotifen
- Dopamine antagonists — haloperidol, chlorpromazine, olanzapine, risperidone, quetiapine
- Adrenergic antagonists:
  - β blockers — propranolol, etc.
- Paradoxically, β-adrenergic agonists are also listed.

Not ephedra/clenbuterol (which is an appetite suppressant), but salbutamol, flerobuterol, Zilpaterol, and related drugs.

  - α_{2} adrenergic antagonists — mirtazapine, mianserin
  - Mixed α_{1}/β blockers — carvedilol
- CB_{1} receptor agonists (cannabinoids — THC/dronabinol (a component of Cannabis), nabilone
- Corticosteroids — dexamethasone, prednisone, hydrocortisone
- Certain pregnene steroids — megestrol acetate, medroxyprogesterone acetate
- Anabolic steroids — oxandrolone, boldenone undecylenate, testosterone
- Other steroids such as Prednisolone
- Sulfonylurea antidiabetic drugs such as glibenclamide, chlorpropamide and tolbutamide
- Mood stabilizers such as lithium
- Some anti-epileptic drugs such as valproate, carbamazepine and gabapentin
- α_{2}δ VDCC ligands — gabapentin, pregabalin
- Ghrelin receptor agonists such as anamorelin, GHRP-6, ibutamoren, ipamorelin, and pralmorelin
- MC_{4} receptor antagonists
- Insulin
- Sugars, such as fructose
- Alcohol beverages
- Benzodiazepines, such as diazepam

== See also ==
- Anorectic (anorexigenic)
- Anorexia
- Eating disorder
- Obesity
- Organic feeding disorder
- Polydipsia
