= Examorelin =

Chemical compound

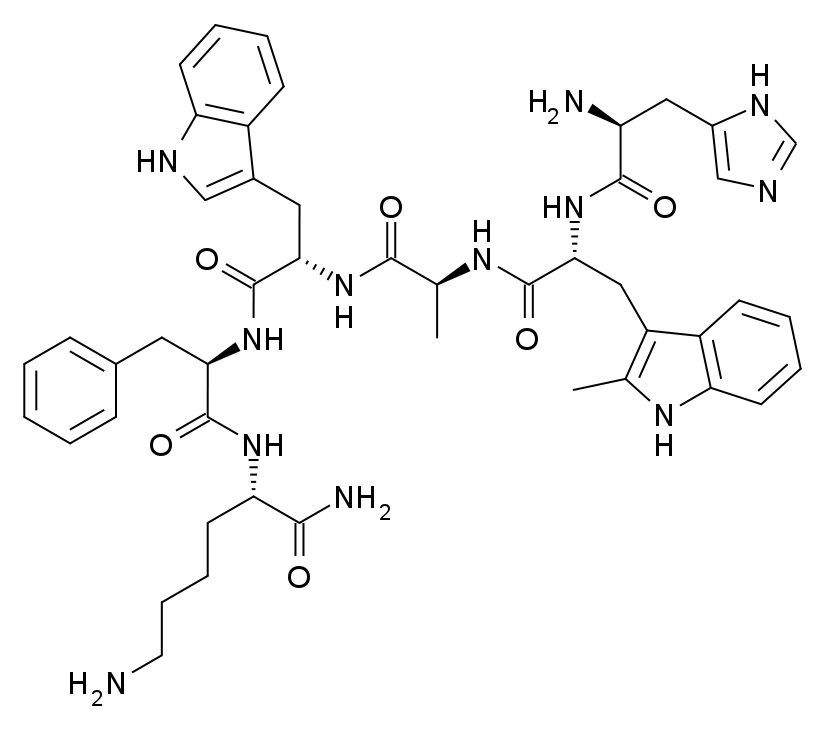

Clinical data
- Other names: L-Histidyl-2-methyl-D-tryptophyl-L-alanyl-L-tryptophyl-D-phenylalanyl-L-lysinamide
- Routes of administration: Intravenous, subcutaneous, intranasal, oral
- ATC code: None

Pharmacokinetic data
- Elimination half-life: ~55 minutes

Identifiers
- IUPAC name: (2S)-6-amino-2-[[(2R)-2-[[(2S)-2-[[(2S)-2-[[(2R)-2-[[(2S)-2-amino-3-(1H-imidazol-5-yl)propanoyl]amino]-3-(2-methyl-1H-indol-3-yl)propanoyl]amino]propanoyl]amino]-3-(1H-indol-3-yl)propanoyl]amino]-3-phenylpropanoyl]amino]hexanamide
- CAS Number: 140703-51-1
- PubChem CID: 6918297
- IUPHAR/BPS: 1100
- ChemSpider: 5293503
- UNII: 09QF37C617
- ChEMBL: ChEMBL108335
- CompTox Dashboard (EPA): DTXSID401032408

Chemical and physical data
- Formula: C_{47}H_{58}N_{12}O_{6}
- Molar mass: 887.059 g·mol^{−1}
- 3D model (JSmol): Interactive image
- SMILES: CC1=C(C2=CC=CC=C2N1)C[C@H](C(=O)N[C@@H](C)C(=O)N[C@@H](CC3=CNC4=CC=CC=C43)C(=O)N[C@H](CC5=CC=CC=C5)C(=O)N[C@@H](CCCCN)C(=O)N)NC(=O)[C@H](CC6=CNC=N6)N
- InChI: InChI=1S/C47H58N12O6/c1-27-34(33-15-7-9-17-37(33)54-27)23-41(58-44(62)35(49)22-31-25-51-26-53-31)45(63)55-28(2)43(61)57-40(21-30-24-52-36-16-8-6-14-32(30)36)47(65)59-39(20-29-12-4-3-5-13-29)46(64)56-38(42(50)60)18-10-11-19-48/h3-9,12-17,24-26,28,35,38-41,52,54H,10-11,18-23,48-49H2,1-2H3,(H2,50,60)(H,51,53)(H,55,63)(H,56,64)(H,57,61)(H,58,62)(H,59,65)/t28-,35-,38-,39+,40-,41+/m0/s1; Key:RVWNMGKSNGWLOL-GIIHNPQRSA-N

Examorelin (INN; also known as hexarelin; developmental codes EP-23905 and MF-6003) is a potent, synthetic, peptidic, orally-active, centrally-penetrant, and highly selective agonist of the ghrelin/growth hormone secretagogue receptor (GHSR) and a growth hormone secretagogue which was developed by Mediolanum Farmaceutici. It is a hexapeptide with the amino acid sequence His-D-2-methyl-Trp-Ala-Trp-D-Phe-Lys-NH_{2} which was derived from GHRP-6. These GH-releasing peptides have no sequence similarity to ghrelin, but mimic ghrelin by acting as agonists at the ghrelin receptor.

Examorelin substantially and dose-dependently increases plasma levels of growth hormone (GH) in animals and humans. In addition, similarly to pralmorelin (GHRP-2) and GHRP-6, it slightly and dose-dependently stimulates the release of prolactin, adrenocorticotropic hormone (ACTH), and cortisol in humans. There are conflicting reports on the ability of examorelin to elevate insulin-like growth factor 1 (IGF-1) and insulin-like growth factor-binding protein 1 (IGFBP-1) levels in humans, with some studies finding no increase and others finding a slight yet statistically significant increase. Examorelin does not affect plasma levels of glucose, luteinizing hormone (LH), follicle-stimulating hormone (FSH), or thyroid-stimulating hormone (TSH) in humans.

Examorelin releases more GH than does growth hormone-releasing hormone (GHRH) in humans, and produces synergistic effects on GH release in combination with GHRH, resulting in "massive" increases in plasma GH levels even with only low doses of examorelin. Pre-administration of GH blunts the GH-releasing effect of examorelin, while, in contrast, fully abolishing the effect of GHRH. Pre-treatment with IGF-1 also blunts the GH-elevating effect of examorelin. Testosterone, testosterone enanthate, and ethinylestradiol, though not oxandrolone, have been found to significantly potentiate the GH-releasing effects of examorelin in humans. In accordance, likely due to increases in sex steroid levels, puberty has also been found to significantly augment the GH-elevating actions of examorelin in humans.

A partial and reversible tolerance to the GH-releasing effects of examorelin occurs in humans with long-term administration (50–75% decrease in efficacy over the course of weeks to months).

Examorelin reached phase II clinical trials for the treatment of growth hormone deficiency and congestive heart failure but did not complete development and was never marketed.

== See also ==
- List of growth hormone secretagogues
