= Growth hormone secretagogue =

Class of drugs

Growth hormone secretagogues or GH secretagogues (GHSs) are a class of drugs which act as secretagogues (i.e., induce the secretion) of growth hormone (GH). They include agonists of the ghrelin/growth hormone secretagogue receptor (GHSR), such as ghrelin (lenomorelin), pralmorelin (GHRP-2), GHRP-6, examorelin (hexarelin), ipamorelin, and ibutamoren (MK-677), and agonists of the growth hormone-releasing hormone receptor (GHRHR), such as growth hormone-releasing hormone (GHRH, somatorelin), CJC-1295, sermorelin, and tesamorelin.

Many of them also induce the secretion of insulin-like growth factor 1 (IGF-1), as well as of other hypothalamic-pituitary hormones such as prolactin and cortisol. The main clinical application of these agents is the treatment of growth hormone deficiency.

== GHRH receptor agonists ==
=== Peptide ===
- GHRH (Somatocrinin, GRF, GHRF)
- CJC-1295 (DAC:GRF)
- Modified GRF (1-29) (CJC without DAC)
- Dumorelin
- Rismorelin
- Sermorelin (Geref, Gerel; GHRH (1-29))
- Somatorelin
- Tesamorelin (Egrifta)

== Ghrelin (GHS) receptor agonists ==
=== Peptide ===
- Ghrelin (Lenomorelin, GHRL)
- GHRP-1
- GHRP-2 (Pralmorelin; GHRP Kaken 100; GHRP-2; KP-102, GPA-748, WAY-GPA-748)
- GHRP-3
- GHRP-4
- GHRP-5
- GHRP-6 (SKF-110679)
- Alexamorelin
- Examorelin (hexarelin; EP-23905, MF-6003)
- Ipamorelin (NNC 26-0161)
- Relamorelin (RM-131, BIM-28131, BIM-28163)
- Tabimorelin (NN-703)

=== Non-peptide ===
- Adenosine
- Anamorelin (ONO-7643, RC-1291, ST-1291)
- Capromorelin (CP-424391)
- Ibutamoren (MK-677, MK-0677, L-163191, LUM-201)
- Macimorelin (AEZS-130, JMV 1843)
- SM-130686

Note that while ulimorelin is a ghrelin receptor agonist, it is not a GHS as it is peripherally selective and has little or no effect on GH secretion. Likewise, adenosine is capable of eliciting a hunger response as a ghrelin agonist but has little to no effect on GH secretion.

== See also ==
- Hypothalamic–pituitary–somatic axis
