= Relamorelin =

Chemical compound

Clinical data
- Routes of administration: Subcutaneous
- ATC code: None

Identifiers
- IUPAC name: 4-[[(2S)-2-[[(2R)-2-[[(2R)-3-(1-Benzothiophen-3-yl)-2-(piperidine-3-carbonylamino)propanoyl]amino]-3-(1H-indol-3-yl)propanoyl]amino]-3-phenylpropanoyl]amino]piperidine-4-carboxamide
- CAS Number: 661472-41-9
- PubChem CID: 85364156
- ChemSpider: 32699203
- UNII: BIW199E18V
- KEGG: D10660
- CompTox Dashboard (EPA): DTXSID701032407

Chemical and physical data
- Formula: C_{43}H_{50}N_{8}O_{5}S
- Molar mass: 790.98 g·mol^{−1}
- 3D model (JSmol): Interactive image
- SMILES: c1ccc(cc1)C[C@@H](C(=O)NC2(CCNCC2)C(=O)N)NC(=O)[C@@H](Cc3c[nH]c4c3cccc4)NC(=O)[C@@H](Cc5csc6c5cccc6)NC(=O)C7CCNCC7
- InChI: InChI=1S/C43H50N8O5S/c44-42(56)43(16-20-46-21-17-43)51-41(55)34(22-27-8-2-1-3-9-27)49-39(53)35(23-29-25-47-33-12-6-4-10-31(29)33)50-40(54)36(48-38(52)28-14-18-45-19-15-28)24-30-26-57-37-13-7-5-11-32(30)37/h1-13,25-26,28,34-36,45-47H,14-24H2,(H2,44,56)(H,48,52)(H,49,53)(H,50,54)(H,51,55)/t34-,35+,36+/m0/s1; Key:KUBPNVYPKPWGRJ-LIVOIKKVSA-N

Relamorelin (INN, USAN) (developmental code names RM-131, BIM-28131, BIM-28163) is a synthetic peptide, centrally penetrant, selective agonist of the ghrelin/growth hormone secretagogue receptor (GHSR) which is under development by Allergan pharmaceuticals for the treatment of diabetic gastroparesis, chronic idiopathic constipation, and anorexia nervosa. It is a pentapeptide and an analogue of ghrelin with improved potency and pharmacokinetics. In humans, relamorelin produces increases in plasma growth hormone, prolactin, and cortisol levels, and, like other GHSR agonists, increases appetite. As of June 2015, relamorelin is in phase II clinical trials for diabetic gastroparesis and constipation. The United States Food and Drug Administration (FDA) has granted Fast Track designation to relamorelin for diabetic gastroparesis. The development of the drug is uncertain as the most recent mention of it was in a 2019 SEC filing from the drug manufacturer lists the drug's expected launch year as 2024, but not in subsequent filings or press releases.

== See also ==
- List of growth hormone secretagogues
