= La Maestra =

La Maestra (English: The Schoolteacher) is a Latin American play written in 1968 by the Colombian playwright, Enrique Buenaventura (1925–2003). It is the first in his series of small one act plays, Los Papeles Del Infierno [The Roles of Hell].

== Plot ==
The play tells the story of a Colombian schoolteacher, La Maestra, who is dead. This creates an eerie, dreamlike quality to the play. Each character she speaks to in the play is someone who has held importance in her past. In the beginning she is seated on a bench and the characters she interacts with do not see her, just as she does not see them. The play opens with the teacher describing the rain in the town and how everything becomes red and muddy. The play ends after the teacher is raped by army sergeants; she cannot eat because of the traumatizing experience and it begins to rain again.

== Characters ==
La Maestra is the main character. She "converses" one-sidedly with each of the following characters. In the beginning, she states that she is dead and describes where she used to live—in a house made of red clay with a straw roof. She grew up in a small town called "Hope" which was named by her father. She truly cares for the children whom she teaches; when she doesn't eat she is thinking of the children. She teaches them the history of their country, Colombia.

- Juana Pasambú: This is the schoolteachers' aunt. She is the first person who replies to the schoolteacher. She questions why La Maestra lost her appetite.
- Pedro Pasambú: This character is the schoolteachers' uncle. After the schoolteacher tells Pedros' wife that she can't eat because she lost her appetite, he replies by recalling that she liked to eat bananas and corn on the cob with salt and butter. He is the second person who converses with the schoolteacher.
- Tobías el Tuerto: (i.e., "Squint-Eyed Tobias" in English) He was the mayor who preceded her father. He says that he brought La Maestra water from the spring where she drank when she was a child and goes on to say that the Maestra refused to drink the water.
- La Vieja Asunción: This is the midwife who delivered La Maestra into the world. She wails inquisitive remarks about why the schoolteacher wouldn't take things from her and why the schoolteacher spit out the soup she offered her. All the while, there is a funeral procession occurring while the midwife is expressing her concerns to the schoolteacher. She refers to La Maestra as "my child".
- Sargento: This character is the police sergeant. He acts as though he is superior to the other characters. He is the character to whom La Maestra speaks with the most during the play. After the funeral procession, the sergeant confers with Peregrino Pasambú, the schoolteacher's father, who makes is appearance on his knees. While the sergeant looks down on Peregrino Pasambú, he refers to him as "the big chief here", because La Maestra's father is the current mayor of the town. Because the sergeant is standing and Peregrino Pasambú is on his knees, the sergeant has power over the mayor. Peregrino Pasambú never replies to the sergeant's statements or questions; he doesn't have any lines in the play; the schoolteacher replies for him. The sergeant asks if the schoolteacher's father got his land because of politics, to which the school teacher recounts that this was not the case; her father got their land because he was one of the founders of the town. The sergeant says that he is going to overrun the town and redistribute the land because "this land ain't divided right." He represents the authoritative power that the military held during this time in Colombian history. To this, the schoolteacher says that when her father assumed power as mayor, "the town was a jungle." The sergeant complains to her father that the jobs weren't distributed properly either, and proceeds to ask him if his daughter is the schoolteacher. La Maestra responds to him by saying that she was indeed the schoolteacher and she taught the child catechism and the country's history. The sergeant grows angry at the schoolteacher and says that he was given orders to reassess and reorganize the town. He shoots Peregrino Pasambú and he and other soldiers subsequently rape La Maestra.
- El Viejo or Peregrino Pasambú: This is La Maestras' father. He is spoken to by the police sergeant, but doesn't reply. Anything spoken to Peregrino Pasambú from the police sergeant is replied to by La Maestra. He helped assemble the town and land where La Maestra has lived her entire life. He is shot by the police sergeant.

== Themes ==
The play deals with the ideas of life and death and how they are intertwined. A major theme is family and how it relates to tradition and culture. La Maestra was the schoolteacher in the town where she lived, and before that her mother was the first schoolteacher of the town; her mother taught her how to be a teacher and then La Maestra became a teacher just as her mother had done before her. Political themes linked to the play include the military and the government. Social themes in the play are violence and rape. The military dictatorship during the 1960s used excessive force as well as violence when they encroached upon towns, as they did in the town of "Hope".
