= SM-130686 =

Chemical compound

Clinical data
- ATC code: none

Identifiers
- IUPAC name: (+)-(3S)-3-(2-chlorophenyl)-1-[2-(diethylamino)ethyl]-3-hydroxo-2-oxo-4-(trifluoromethyl)indoline-6-carboxamide
- CAS Number: 259666-71-2
- PubChem CID: 9890863
- ChemSpider: 7980503
- UNII: 1GH34I6261

Chemical and physical data
- Formula: C_{22}H_{23}ClF_{3}N_{3}O_{3}
- Molar mass: 469.89 g·mol^{−1}
- 3D model (JSmol): Interactive image
- SMILES: FC(F)(F)c3c1c(cc(c3)C(N)=O)N(CCN(CC)CC)C(=O)C1(O)c2ccccc2Cl
- InChI: InChI=1S/C22H23ClF3N3O3/c1-3-28(4-2)9-10-29-17-12-13(19(27)30)11-15(22(24,25)26)18(17)21(32,20(29)31)14-7-5-6-8-16(14)23/h5-8,11-12,32H,3-4,9-10H2,1-2H3,(H2,27,30)/t21-/m1/s1; Key:YSSPGXCFFITNCE-OAQYLSRUSA-N

SM-130686 is a small-molecule drug which acts as a potent, orally-active agonist of the ghrelin/growth hormone secretagogue receptor (GHSR) and growth hormone secretagogue, with around half the potency of the endogenous agonist ghrelin as a stimulator of growth hormone release. It produces dose-dependent increases in muscle mass and decrease in body fat, and is under investigation for the treatment of growth hormone deficiency and other medical conditions. Concerns about its potential use as a performance-enhancing drug for athletes have led to the development of urine tests for SM-130686 and other GHSR agonists, even though no drugs from this class have yet progressed to clinical use.

== See also ==
- List of growth hormone secretagogues
