= Tabimorelin =

Chemical compound

Clinical data
- Other names: ((2E)-5-amino-5-methylhex-2-enoic acid N-methyl-N-((1R)-1-(N-methyl-N-((1R)-1-(methylcarbamoyl)-2-phenylethyl)carbamoyl)-2-(2-naphthyl)ethyl)amide)
- ATC code: none

Identifiers
- IUPAC name: N-[(2E)-5-amino-5-methylhex-enoyl]-N-methyl-3-(2-naphthyl)alanyl-N,Nα-dimethyl-D-phenylalaninamide
- CAS Number: 193079-69-5
- PubChem CID: 9810101
- ChemSpider: 7985857
- UNII: L51CBE03KF
- CompTox Dashboard (EPA): DTXSID601027158

Chemical and physical data
- Formula: C_{32}H_{40}N_{4}O_{3}
- Molar mass: 528.697 g·mol^{−1}
- 3D model (JSmol): Interactive image
- SMILES: CC(C)(C/C=C/C(=O)N(C)[C@H](CC1=CC2=CC=CC=C2C=C1)C(=O)N(C)[C@H](CC3=CC=CC=C3)C(=O)NC)N
- InChI: InChI=1S/C32H40N4O3/c1-32(2,33)19-11-16-29(37)35(4)28(22-24-17-18-25-14-9-10-15-26(25)20-24)31(39)36(5)27(30(38)34-3)21-23-12-7-6-8-13-23/h6-18,20,27-28H,19,21-22,33H2,1-5H3,(H,34,38)/b16-11+/t27-,28-/m1/s1; Key:WURGZWOTGMLDJP-ZCYANPAGSA-N

Tabimorelin (INN; development code NN-703) is a drug which acts as a potent, orally-active agonist of the ghrelin/growth hormone secretagogue receptor (GHSR) and growth hormone secretagogue, mimicking the effects of the endogenous peptide agonist ghrelin as a stimulator of growth hormone (GH) release. It was one of the first GH secretagogues developed and is largely a modified polypeptide, but it is nevertheless orally-active in vivo. Tabimorelin produced sustained increases in levels of GH and insulin-like growth factor 1 (IGF-1), along with smaller transient increases in levels of other hormones such as adrenocorticotropic hormone (ACTH), cortisol, and prolactin. However actual clinical effects in adults with growth hormone deficiency were limited, with only the most severely GH-deficient patients showing significant benefit, and tabimorelin was also found to act as a CYP3A4 inhibitor which could cause it to have undesirable interactions with other drugs.

== See also ==
- List of growth hormone secretagogues
