= Josh Lynch =

English rugby league footballer

Personal information
- Full name: Joshua Lynch
- Born: 8 November 2003 (age 22) Liverpool, England

Playing information
- Position: Wing, Fullback
Club
Years	Team	Pld	T	G	FG	P
2022–	Warrington Wolves	1	1	0	0	4
2023(loan)	→ North Wales Crusaders	1	0	0	0	0
	Total	2	1	0	0	4
- Source: As of 24 September 2023

Josh Lynch is a professional rugby league footballer who plays as a winger for Warrington Wolves in the Super League.

== Playing career ==
=== Warrington Wolves ===
In 2022 Lynch made his debut for Warrington in the Super League against the Huddersfield Giants.

=== North Wales Crusaders ===
On 18 Feb 2023, it was announced that he had joined North Wales Crusaders on loan for the remainder of the 2023 season.

=== Doping ban ===
On 19 March 2025, Lynch was banned for 16 months for using the prohibited substance ibutamoren, a growth hormone banned in most sports. He had already been provisional suspended in February 2024 by UK Anti-Doping (Ukad) due to a provided sample returning an 'adverse analytical finding' (AAF) in December 2023, and as this ban will include the time he has spent on the side lines, he will therefore be available for selection from June 2025.

After his provisional suspension, Lynch accepted he had violated anti-doping rules but wished to challenge his sanction, having denied that he knowingly or intentionally used ibutamoren. In response to Ukad's charge, he said he ingested the substance accidentally, as his friend prepared a protein shake for him without his oversight using a blender. He added that a friend had previously used the blender to prepare their own protein shake which contained ibutamoren.

Having instructed a scientific expert to analyse Lynch's account, Ukad concluded that the explanation was plausible, saying that had he been a regular user of the substance, it would have appeared in a further sample given in January 2024.

The matter was referred to the independent National Anti-Doping Panel (NADP) for a hearing in December 2024, during which Lynch and his friend gave evidence and were cross-examined by Ukad.

In a decision issued in January, the NADP accepted Lynch's account and ruled he had not acted with intent, imposing a 16-month ban.
