= Somatorelin =

Chemical compound

Clinical data
- Trade names: GHRH Ferring
- AHFS/Drugs.com: International Drug Names
- ATC code: V04CD05 (WHO)

Identifiers
- CAS Number: 83930-13-6
- PubChem CID: 16132353
- IUPHAR/BPS: 2270
- ChemSpider: none
- UNII: 4UR7N9Z9MM
- CompTox Dashboard (EPA): DTXSID40232828

Chemical and physical data
- Formula: C_{215}H_{358}N_{72}O_{66}S
- Molar mass: 5039.73 g·mol^{−1}

Somatorelin is a diagnostic agent for determining growth hormone deficiency. It is a recombinant version of growth hormone-releasing hormone (GHRH).

Somatorelin has been used to study hormone deficiency (particularly growth hormone deficiency), cognitive impairment, sleep disorders, and aging.

== See also ==
- List of growth hormone secretagogues
