= Macimorelin =

Chemical compound

Clinical data
- Trade names: Macrilen
- Other names: Aib-Trp-gTrp-CHO; AEZS-130; JMV 1843; Macimorelin acetate
- AHFS/Drugs.com: Professional Drug Facts
- License data: US DailyMed: Macimorelin
- Routes of administration: By mouth
- ATC code: V04CD06 (WHO)

Legal status
- Legal status: US: ℞-only; EU: Rx-only

Pharmacokinetic data
- Metabolism: Hepatic (CYP3A4-mediated)
- Elimination half-life: 4.1 hours

Identifiers
- IUPAC name: 2-Amino-N-[(2R)-1-[[(1R)-1-formamido-2-(1H-indol-3-yl)ethyl]amino]-3-1H-indol-3-yl)-1-oxopropan-2-yl]-2-methylpropanamide
- CAS Number: 381231-18-1 945212-59-9 (acetate)
- PubChem CID: 9804938
- DrugBank: DB13074
- ChemSpider: 7980698
- UNII: 8680B21W73
- KEGG: D10563; as salt: D10562
- ChEMBL: ChEMBL278623
- CompTox Dashboard (EPA): DTXSID601045766

Chemical and physical data
- Formula: C_{26}H_{30}N_{6}O_{3}
- Molar mass: 474.565 g·mol^{−1}
- 3D model (JSmol): Interactive image
- SMILES: CC(C)(C(=O)N[C@H](CC1=CNC2=CC=CC=C21)C(=O)N[C@H](CC3=CNC4=CC=CC=C43)NC=O)N
- InChI: InChI=1S/C26H30N6O3/c1-26(2,27)25(35)31-22(11-16-13-28-20-9-5-3-7-18(16)20)24(34)32-23(30-15-33)12-17-14-29-21-10-6-4-8-19(17)21/h3-10,13-15,22-23,28-29H,11-12,27H2,1-2H3,(H,30,33)(H,31,35)(H,32,34)/t22-,23-/m1/s1; Key:UJVDJAPJQWZRFR-DHIUTWEWSA-N

Macimorelin (INN) – or Macrilen (trade name) – is a drug that was developed by Aeterna Zentaris for use in the diagnosis of adult growth hormone deficiency. Macimorelin acetate, the salt formulation, is a synthetic growth hormone secretagogue receptor agonist. It is a growth hormone secretagogue receptor (ghrelin receptor) agonist, causing release of growth hormone from the pituitary gland. Macimorelin acetate is described chemically as D-Tryptophanamide, 2-methylalanyl-N-[(1R)-1-(formylamino)-2-(1H-indol-3-yl)ethyl]-acetate.

Macimorelin (Macrilen) was invented and first synthesized at University of Montpellier, Centre National de la Recherche Scientitifique (CNRS), France. This transpired from a long-lasting research collaboration with Aeterna Zentaris. Aeterna Zentaris later in-licensed macimorelin as a development candidate from the CNRS and proceeded with the pre-clinical and clinical development of the compound.

As of January 2014, it was in Phase III clinical trials. The phase III trial for growth hormone deficiency is expected to be complete in December 2016.

As of December 2017, it was FDA-approved as a method to diagnose growth hormone deficiency. Traditionally, growth hormone deficiency was diagnosed via means of insulin tolerance test (IST) or glucagon stimulation test (GST). These two means are done parenterally, whereas Macrilen boasts an oral formulation for ease of administration for patients and providers.

In November 2018 Novo Nordisk would acquire the rights to Macrilen, at a cost of $145 million. In 2022 Novo Nordisk would give up their rights to Macrilen, returning them and all associated licensing to Aeterna Zentaris.

The US Food and Drug Administration (FDA) considers it to be a first-in-class medication.

== See also ==
- List of growth hormone secretagogues
