= Anamorelin =

Chemical compound

Clinical data
- Routes of administration: Oral
- ATC code: None

Pharmacokinetic data
- Elimination half-life: 6–7 hours

Identifiers
- IUPAC name: 2-Amino-N-[(2R)-1-[(3R)-3-benzyl-3-[dimethylamino(methyl)carbamoyl]piperidin-1-yl]-3-(1H-indol-3-yl)-1-oxopropan-2-yl]-2-methylpropanamide
- CAS Number: 249921-19-5
- PubChem CID: 9828911
- ChemSpider: 8004650
- UNII: DD5RBA1NKF
- CompTox Dashboard (EPA): DTXSID20179702

Chemical and physical data
- Formula: C_{31}H_{42}N_{6}O_{3}
- Molar mass: 546.716 g·mol^{−1}
- 3D model (JSmol): Interactive image
- SMILES: CC(C)(C(=O)N[C@H](Cc1c[nH]c2c1cccc2)C(=O)N3CCC[C@](C3)(Cc4ccccc4)C(=O)N(C)N(C)C)N
- InChI: InChI=1S/C31H42N6O3/c1-30(2,32)28(39)34-26(18-23-20-33-25-15-10-9-14-24(23)25)27(38)37-17-11-16-31(21-37,29(40)36(5)35(3)4)19-22-12-7-6-8-13-22/h6-10,12-15,20,26,33H,11,16-19,21,32H2,1-5H3,(H,34,39)/t26-,31-/m1/s1; Key:VQPFSIRUEPQQPP-MXBOTTGLSA-N

Anamorelin (INN; also known as anamorelin hydrochloride (USAN, JAN); development codes ONO-7643, RC-1291, and ST-1291) is a non-peptide, orally-active, centrally-penetrant, selective agonist of the ghrelin/growth hormone secretagogue receptor (GHSR) with appetite-enhancing and anabolic effects which is under development by Helsinn Healthcare SA for the treatment of cancer cachexia and anorexia.

Anamorelin significantly increases plasma levels of growth hormone (GH), insulin-like growth factor 1 (IGF-1), and insulin-like growth factor-binding protein 3 (IGFBP-3) in humans, without affecting plasma levels of prolactin, cortisol, insulin, glucose, adrenocorticotropic hormone (ACTH), luteinizing hormone (LH), follicle-stimulating hormone (FSH), or thyroid-stimulating hormone (TSH). In addition, anamorelin significantly increases appetite, overall body weight, lean body mass, and muscle strength, with increases in body weight correlating directly with increases in plasma IGF-1 levels.

As of February 2016, anamorelin has completed phase III clinical trials for the treatment of cancer cachexia and anorexia associated with non-small-cell lung carcinoma.

On 18 May 2017, the European Medicines Agency recommended the refusal of the marketing authorisation for the medicinal product, intended for the treatment of anorexia, cachexia or unintended weight loss in patients with non-small cell lung cancer. Helsinn requested a re-examination of the initial opinion. After considering the grounds for this request, the European Medicines Agency re-examined the opinion, and confirmed the refusal of the marketing authorisation on 14 September 2017. The European Medicines Agency concluded that the studies show a marginal effect of anamorelin on lean body mass and no proven effect on hand grip strength or patients’ quality of life. In addition, following an inspection at clinical study sites, the agency considered that the safety data on the medicine had not been recorded adequately. Therefore, the agency was of the opinion that the benefits of anamorelin did not outweigh its risks.

== See also ==
- List of growth hormone secretagogues – Class of drugs
