= Kenneth Fearon =

Scottish surgeon and cancer specialist

Kenneth C. H. Fearon FRCSE FRCPSG (3 August 1960 – 3 September 2016) was a Scottish surgeon and cancer specialist. He was Professor of Surgical Oncology at the University of Edinburgh with a special interest in cachexia.

== Life ==
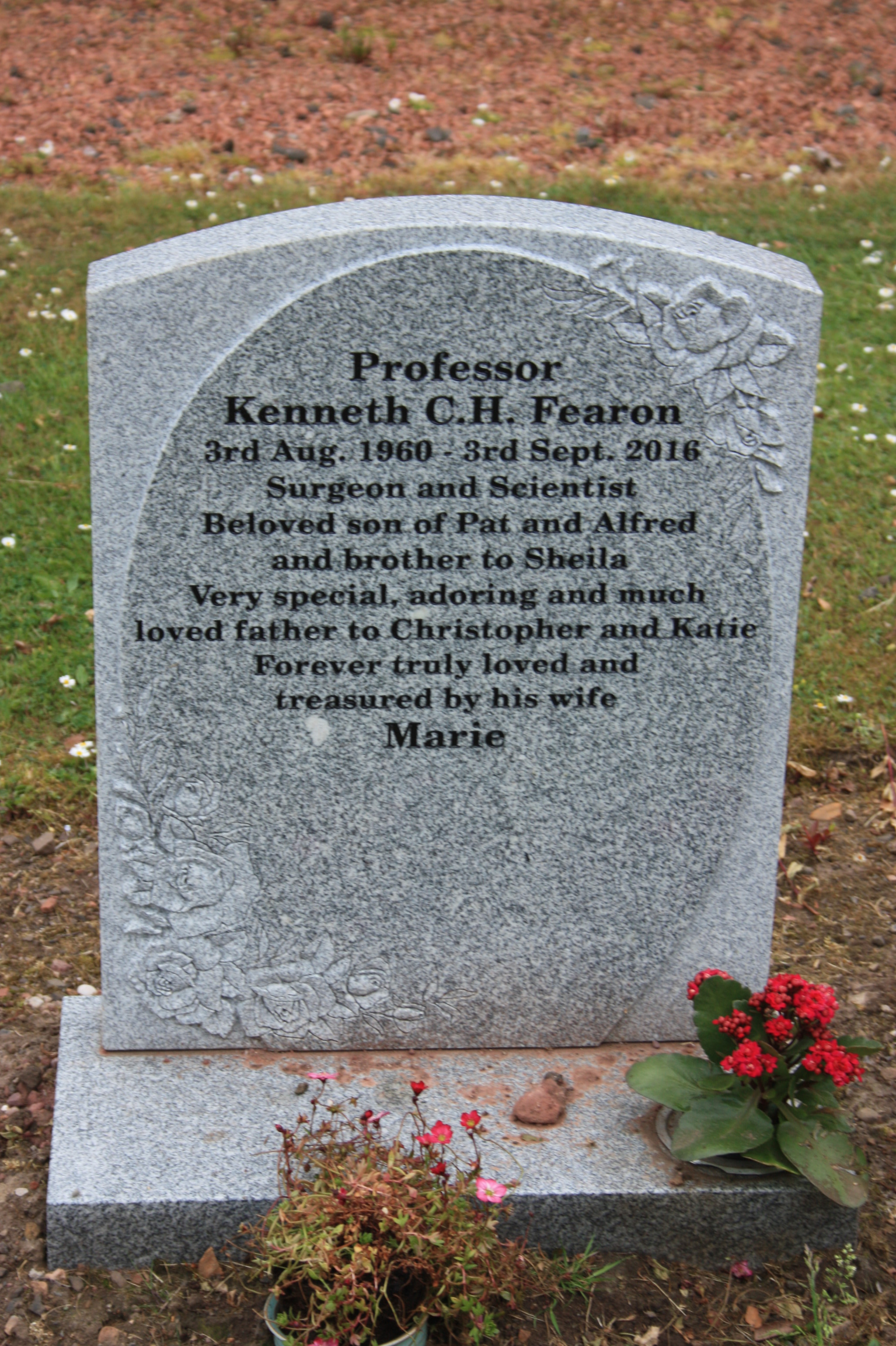
The grave of Prof Kenneth Fearon, Grange Cemetery

Kenneth C. H. Fearon was born in Glasgow, Scotland on 3 August 1960 the son of Pat and Alfred Fearon. He was educated at St Aloysius' College. Glasgow then studied medicine at the University of Glasgow, winning the Brunton Medal in 1982, and graduating MB ChB. In 1983 he began specialising in cancer under Professor Kenneth Calman. He gained his doctorate (MD) in 1988.

In 1988 he began lecturing in surgery at the University of Edinburgh under Sir David Carter, becoming a senior lecturer in 1993. He gained his professorship in 1999 and thereafter mainly worked at the Western General Hospital in Edinburgh. He was a founding member of the Enhanced Recovery After Surgery (ERAS) Group.

In 1991 he was awarded the David Cuthbertson Medal by the Nutrition Society of Great Britain and Ireland.

He oversaw multiple scholarship and bursary applications for the Royal College of Surgeons of Edinburgh and was Chairman of its Research Committee from 2006 to 2014.

He died in Edinburgh on 3 September 2016. He was buried on 17 September 2016 following a service in St Mary's Roman Catholic Cathedral in Edinburgh. He is buried in the Grange Cemetery in south Edinburgh. The grave lies in a line of modern graves just north of the central vaults.

== Publications ==
- Cancer Associated Cachexia

== Personal life ==
He was married to Professor Marie Fallon and together they had two children, Christopher and Katie.
