= Cachexia =

Syndrome causing muscle loss

- Other names: Wasting syndrome
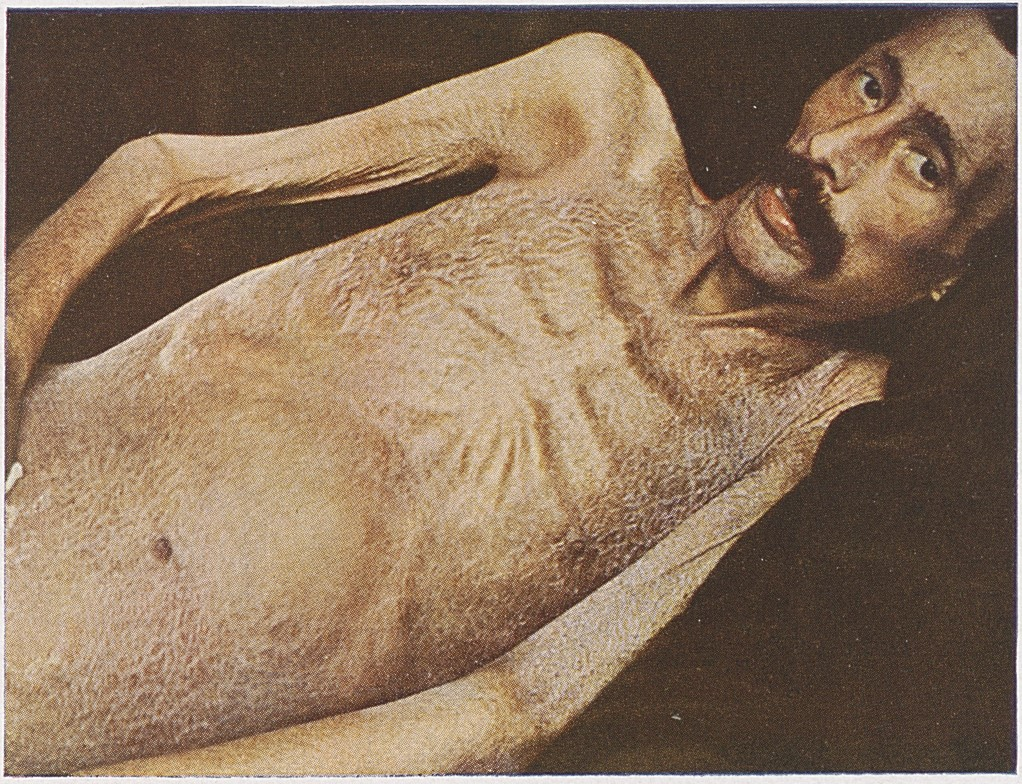
- Person with cancer-associated cachexia
- Specialty: Oncology, internal medicine, physical medicine and rehabilitation
- Symptoms: Sudden weight loss, altered eating signals
- Prognosis: Very poor
- Frequency: 1%
- Deaths: 1.5 to 2 million people a year

Cachexia (/kəˈkɛksiə/) is a syndrome that occurs in people with certain illnesses, causing muscle loss that cannot be fully reversed with improved nutrition. It most commonly occurs in cases of cancer, congestive heart failure, chronic obstructive pulmonary disease, chronic kidney disease, and AIDS. These conditions change how the body handles inflammation, metabolism, and brain signaling. This can lead to muscle loss and other harmful changes to body composition over time. Unlike weight loss from inadequate caloric intake, cachexia mainly causes muscle loss and can happen with or without fat loss. Diagnosis of cachexia is difficult because there are no clear guidelines, and its occurrence varies from one affected person to the next.

Like malnutrition, cachexia can lead to worse health outcomes and lower quality of life. The prognosis of patients with cachexia varies depending on the type and severity of the underlying illness, but is typically poor, especially with patients in late stages of disease. Cachexia can improve significantly with effective treatment of the underlying illness, but symptomatic treatment approaches such as nutritional therapy and exercise typically do not result in reversal of the syndrome, and have very limited benefit in advanced cases of cachexia.

== Definition ==
Cachexia is hard to define because it often happens alongside malnutrition and sarcopenia. Since there are no clear rules separating these conditions, experts continue working to agree on definitions to help treat these nutrition-related problems.

In the past, cachexia was described as "a complex metabolic syndrome associated with underlying illness and characterized by loss of muscle with or without loss of fat mass." In 2011, experts updated this definition, saying cachexia is "a multifactorial syndrome defined by an ongoing loss of skeletal muscle mass (with or without loss of fat mass) that cannot be fully reversed by conventional nutritional support and leads to progressive functional impairment." They also suggested breaking it into three stages: pre-cachexia, cachexia, and refractory cachexia.

=== Cachexia and malnutrition ===
Cachexia and malnutrition are related but not the same. Malnutrition happens when the body doesn't get enough nutrients, leading to changes in body weight, physical strength, and mental function. Malnutrition includes both disease-related malnutrition as well as malnutrition without disease such as seen in starvation or aging. Cachexia should be viewed as a type of malnutrition in which inflammation from a long-term illness causes unwanted muscle loss.

=== Cachexia and sarcopenia ===
Cachexia and sarcopenia are similar because both cause weight and muscle loss, along with symptoms like weakness and loss of appetite. The difference is sarcopenia is caused by aging, while cachexia happens due to long-term disease and inflammation.

== Causes ==

Cachexia is most commonly associated with end-stage cancer, often called cancer cachexia.

Other conditions that frequently cause cachexia include:

- Congestive heart failure
- AIDS
- Chronic obstructive pulmonary disease
- Chronic kidney disease

Cachexia can happen in late stages of diseases like cystic fibrosis, multiple sclerosis, motor neuron disease, Parkinson's disease, dementia, tuberculosis, multiple system atrophy, mercury poisoning, Crohn's disease, trypanosomiasis, rheumatoid arthritis, celiac disease, and other diseases that affect the entire body.

== Mechanism ==
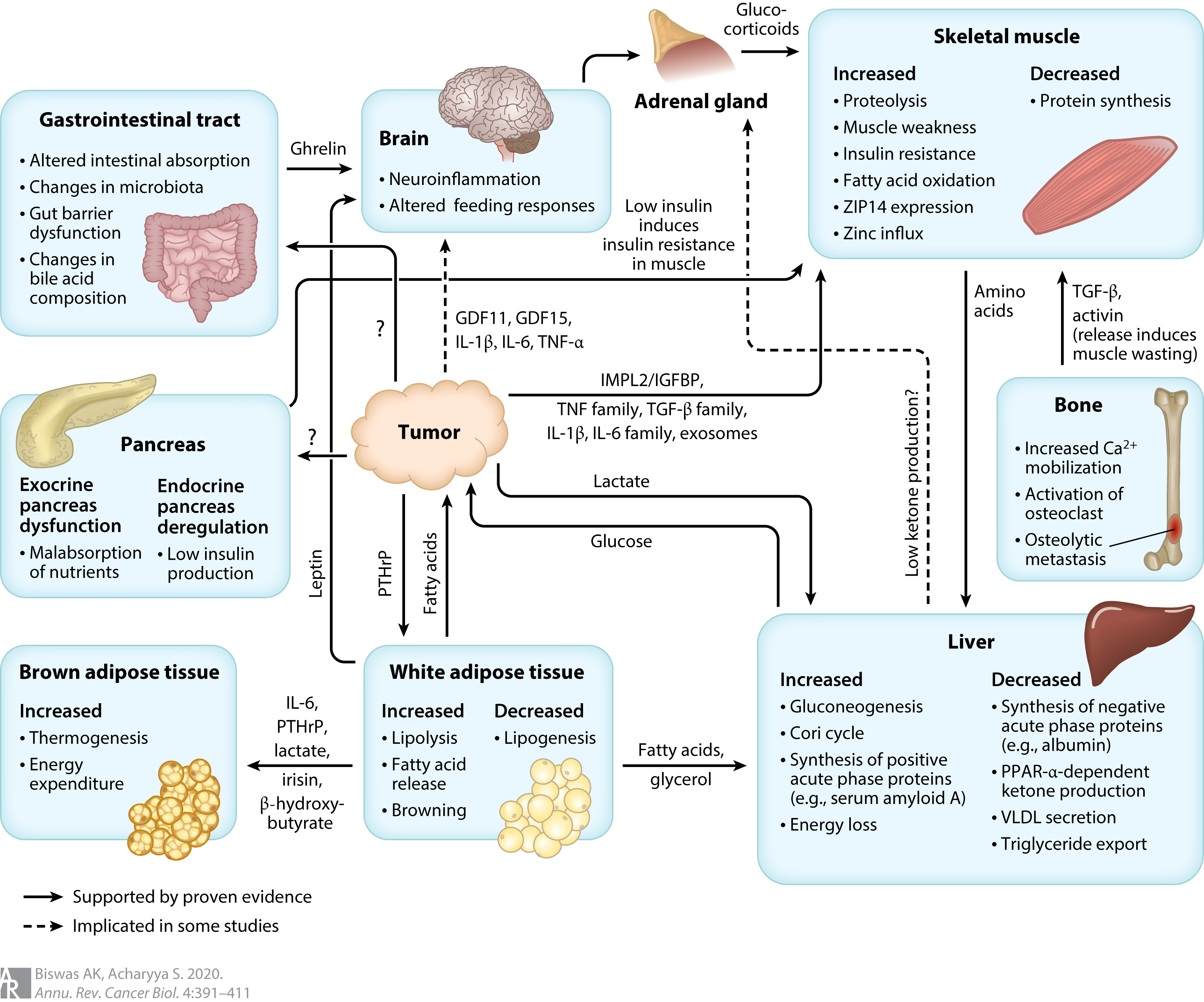
Processes and mechanisms related to cancer-associated cachexia

The way cachexia works is not well understood, but research suggests the cause is linked to these main processes in the body: inflammation, changes in metabolism, and hormone changes in the body.

=== Inflammatory ===
Certain molecules in the body, called Inflammatory cytokines, play a big role in causing cachexia. Two important ones are tumor necrosis factor (TNF) and interleukin 6 (IL-6).

==== Tumor necrosis factor (TNF) ====
TNF breaks down muscle and fat while stopping new muscle and fat cells from forming by activating the ubiquitin proteasome pathway. It also triggers the release of other cytokines that also speed up muscle loss. Since this process is very complex, cachexia is unlikely to be caused by one molecule. While it is thought to be produced by immune cells called macrophages, scientists are still unsure of exactly where TNF is produced in cachexia.

==== Interleukin-6 (IL-6) ====
IL-6 is thought to cause muscle loss by starting a pathway called the JAK/STAT pathway. IL-6 is produced by immune cells called macrophages, potentially producing acute phase reactants which may worsen muscle loss.

Other molecules may include:

- Myostatin - Prevents muscle growth and is often higher in people with cancer.
- Activin - May contribute to muscle loss when TNF is also active.
- Growth Differentiation Factor 15 (GDF-15) - Normally produced during cellular stress. Thought to play a role in food aversion and is associated with reduced food intake.

=== Metabolic ===
Cachexia can also result from changes in metabolism. Tumors sometimes release molecules that break down fat and muscle, causing cachexia by making it harder for the body to keep up with energy needs. These molecules include lipid mobilizing factor, proteolysis-inducing factor, and mitochondrial uncoupling proteins. In addition, uncontrolled inflammation in people with cachexia increases the body's need for nutrients.

The way the body uses nutrients is also changed in cachexia. People with cachexia can have loss of appetite, are less responsive to insulin, and can have increased fat breakdown, all of which make it difficult for the body to properly use food. This is especially true in people with cancer.

=== Hormonal ===
Hormones are signaling molecules used to regulate bodily behavior and are believed to play a role in cachexia as well.

Glucocorticoids are produced as part of the body's natural response to stress. They are also known to play a role in muscle breakdown. Furthermore, people with long-term illness such as cancer are frequently treated with glucocorticoids, making cachexia more likely in these individuals.

Some tumors produce a molecule called parathyroid-related peptide (PTHrP). It increases metabolism by stimulating energy production in the mitochondria of fat cells.

Leptin is a hormone known to decrease appetite. People with cachexia often have high leptin levels, making them feel less hungry.

The hypothalamus, the brain's appetite control center, is also affected in cachexia. Given the hypothalamic function in controlling appetite, it is believed to play a role in cachexia. The appetite-controlling center of the hypothalamus is controlled by neuropeptide Y (NPY) and agouti gene-related protein (AgRP) that increase appetite, as well as proopiomelanocortin (POMC) and cocaine- and amphetamine-regulated transcript (CART) that decrease appetite. Inflammation may disrupt these appetite signals, causing reduced hunger and leading to further weight and muscle loss. However, scientists are still studying exactly how this process works.

== Diagnosis ==
Doctors formerly diagnosed cachexia mainly by looking at changes in body weight. A person was considered to have cachexia if they had a low BMI or unwanted weight loss of more than 10%. However, weight alone is not always a reliable method. Factors like fluid buildup (edema), tumor size, and obesity can make it difficult to diagnose cachexia. These weight-based criteria do not account for muscle loss, which is a key part in cachexia.

To improve diagnosis of cachexia, experts proposed adding lab tests and symptom evaluations. With that, a person might have cachexia if they lost at least 5% of their total body weight in 12 months or had a BMI under less 22 kg/m^{2} with at least three of the following: weak muscles, fatigue, loss of appetite, low muscle mass, or abnormal labs.

There have been attempts to define specific types of cachexia, such as cardiac cachexia, which can occur in people with congestive heart failure. However, it has no widely accepted definition.

=== Latest criteria ===
Cancer cachexia is diagnosed based on:

1. Unwanted weight loss of more than 5% within 6 months.
2. For people with a BMI of less than 20 kg/m^{2}, weight loss of more than 2%.
3. For people with sarcopenia, weight loss of more than 2%.

New ways to score and stage cachexia are being explored, particularly in people with advanced cancer.

==== Scoring systems ====
To better understand how severe cachexia is in each person, doctors use scoring systems like the Cachexia Staging Score and Cachexia Score.

The Cachexia Staging Score (CSS) looks at weight loss, muscle function, appetite loss, and lab test results to categorize people into four stages: non-cachexia, pre-cachexia, cachexia, and refractory cachexia. Those in more advanced stages have less muscle mass, more frequent age-related muscle loss, worse symptoms, poorer quality of life, as well as shorter survival periods.

==== Staging ====
- Non-cachexia (0–2 points) – No major weight loss or problems with appetite.
- Pre-cachexia (3–4 points) – Mild weight loss and appetite issues. Early treatment at this stage might slow progression of cachexia.
- Cachexia (5–8 points) – Significant muscle loss that is difficult to reverse and affects daily function.
- Refractory cachexia (9–12 points) – Severe weight and muscle loss with poor response to treatment and a life expectancy of less than 3 months.

The Cachexia SCOre (CASCO) is another scoring system that looks at weight loss, inflammation, metabolism, immune function, physical ability, appetite, and quality of life to provide a more detailed assessment.

=== Laboratory tests ===
Laboratory tests are sometimes used to check for cachexia. Tests that are used include albumin, C-reactive protein, ghrelin, IGF-2, and leptin. Acute phase reactants (IL-6, IL-1b, tumor necrosis factor, IL-8, interferon gamma and serum cytokines are also studied but are not always reliable for predicting cachexia. Laboratory cut-off values are also not the same across different institutions. There is no single lab test that can confirm cachexia or predict whether it will develop.

=== Imaging ===
One challenge in diagnosing cachexia is measuring muscle loss in an easy and affordable way. Some imaging techniques that can help assess body composition include:

- Bioelectrical impedance analysis (BIA)
- Computed tomography (CT scans)
- Dual-energy X-ray absorptiometry (DEXA)
- Magnetic resonance imaging (MRI)

However, these methods are not widely used because they can be expensive and difficult to access.

== Treatment ==
Because cachexia is a complex condition with several potential causes, treatment requires multiple approaches at the same time. The best strategy is to treat the cause of the cachexia, if known. For example, people with cachexia caused by AIDS often improve after starting treatment for AIDS. However, because the exact mechanism of cachexia is unclear, there is no single medication that can effectively treat it. Instead, treatment focuses on a combination of exercise, nutrition, medications like appetite stimulants and androgens like nandrolone decanoate, and psychosocial support.

=== Exercise ===
Regular physical exercise is recommended for the treatment of cachexia because of its positive effects on muscle function. Exercise can reduce protein breakdown, improve muscle strength, decrease inflammation, and enhance metabolism. However, its effectiveness in cancer patients - especially those who are frail or have sarcopenia - remains uncertain. Many people with cachexia also avoid exercise because they lack motivation or fear that it will worsen their symptoms.

=== Nutrition ===
Cachexia can increase metabolism and suppress appetite, worsening the present muscle loss. Studies show that high-calorie, protein-rich diets may help stabilize weight, though they do not necessarily improve muscle mass. Recommendations include 1.5g/kg/day of protein, making up 15-20% of daily calories. However, feeding tubes (enteral nutrition) should not be used routinely.

=== Medications ===
Some medications, such as glucocorticoids, cannabinoids, and progestins were initially used in treating cachexia and aim to increase appetite. Progestins showed promise initially, but they do not stop muscle wasting and may cause fluid retention, fat gain, and other side effects.

Ghrelin agonists, such as anamorelin are commonly used in cancer treatment to boost appetite, increase weight, and increase muscle mass. However, its use and effectiveness in cachexia is not well studied.

Selective androgen receptor modulators (SARMs) such as enobosarm show promise in increasing physical performance and muscle mass, but more studies are needed to confirm their effectiveness in cachexia.

The use of anti-inflammatory medications have been investigated. Thalidomide, an anti-inflammatory agent, has shown promise in preventing weight loss, but the use of this medication in cachexia is not widely accepted. However, other TNF inhibitors have not shown the same promising results. NSAIDs such as celecoxib and ibuprofen showed some early benefits, but side effects (renal injury, GI bleeding) limit their use.

Anti-nausea drugs such as 5-HT_{3} antagonists are also commonly used if nausea is a prominent symptom.

Anabolic steroids like oxandrolone may help but are only recommended for short term use due to side effects including liver toxicity.

=== Supplements ===
The use of certain amino acids may slow muscle breakdown by providing the body with the building blocks needed for metabolism of muscle and glucose. Specifically, leucine and valine may block muscle breakdown. Glutamine is used in oral supplements for people with advanced cancer or HIV/AIDS.

β-hydroxy β-methylbutyrate (HMB) is a molecule that comes from leucine that promotes muscle growth. Studies show positive results for chronic pulmonary disease, hip fracture, and in AIDS-related and cancer-related cachexia. However, it is often studied along with other nutrients, making it difficult to assess its effects alone.

Creatine supplementation may help reduce muscle wasting, though more research is needed.

== Epidemiology ==
Accurate epidemiological data on the prevalence of cachexia is lacking due to changing diagnostic criteria and under-identification of people with the disorder. It is estimated that cachexia from any disease is estimated to affect more than 5 million people in the United States. The prevalence of cachexia is growing and estimated at 1% of the population. The prevalence is lower in Asia but due to the larger population, represents a similar burden. Cachexia is also a significant problem in South America and Africa.

In people with cancer, prevalence of cachexia was previously reported to range from 11% to 71%. Recent updates show that 33%-51.8% of people with cancer develop cachexia, though estimates vary widely and may be unreliable due to absence of consensus guidelines for diagnosis, variability in cancer populations, and variability in timing of diagnosis. Specifically, the highest rates were seen in older populations as well as those with upper gastrointestinal, colorectal, and lung cancers, respectively. The prevalence increases in advanced cancer stages, affecting up to 80% of terminal cancer cases.

The most frequent diseases causing cachexia in the United States are: 1) cancer, 2) chronic heart failure, 3) chronic kidney disease, 4) COPD.

Cachexia contributes to significant loss of function and healthcare utilization. Estimates suggest that cachexia accounted for 177,640 hospital stays in 2016 in the United States. Cachexia is considered the immediate cause of death of many people with cancer, estimated between 22 and 40%.

== History ==
The word "cachexia" is derived from the Greek words kakos 'bad' and hexis 'condition'. English ophthalmologist John Zachariah Laurence was the first to use the phrase "cancerous cachexia", doing so in 1858. He applied the phrase to the chronic wasting associated with malignancy. It was not until 2011 that the term "cancer-associated cachexia" was given a formal definition, with a publication by Kenneth Fearon. Fearon defined it as "a multifactorial syndrome characterized by ongoing loss of skeletal muscle (with or without loss of fat mass) that cannot be fully reversed by conventional nutritional support and leads to progressive functional impairment".

== Research ==
Several medications are under investigation or have been previously trialed for use in cachexia but are not in widespread clinical use:

- Thalidomide
- Cytokine antagonists
- Cannabinoids
- Omega-3 fatty acids, including eicosapentaenoic acid (EPA)
- Non-steroidal anti-inflammatory drugs
- Prokinetics
- Ghrelin and ghrelin receptor agonist
- Anabolic catabolic transforming agents such as MT-102
- Selective androgen receptor modulators
- Cyproheptadine
- Hydrazine sulfate

Medical marijuana has been allowed for the treatment of cachexia in some US states, such as Missouri, Illinois, Maryland, Delaware, Nevada, Michigan, Washington, Oregon, California, Colorado, New Mexico, Arizona, Vermont, New Jersey, Rhode Island, Maine, and New York Hawaii and Connecticut.

=== Multimodal therapy ===
Despite the extensive investigation into single therapeutic targets for cachexia, the most effective treatments use multi-targeted therapies. In Europe, a combination of non-drug approaches including physical training, nutritional counseling, and psychotherapeutic intervention are used in belief this approach may be more effective than monotherapy. Administration of anti-inflammatory drugs showed efficacy and safety in the treatment of people with advanced cancer cachexia.

== See also ==
- Malnutrition
- Undernutrition in older adults
- Sarcopenia
- Muscle atrophy
- Marasmus
- Cancer
- Progressive disease
- Refeeding syndrome
- Journal of Cachexia, Sarcopenia and Muscle
