= Secretin family =

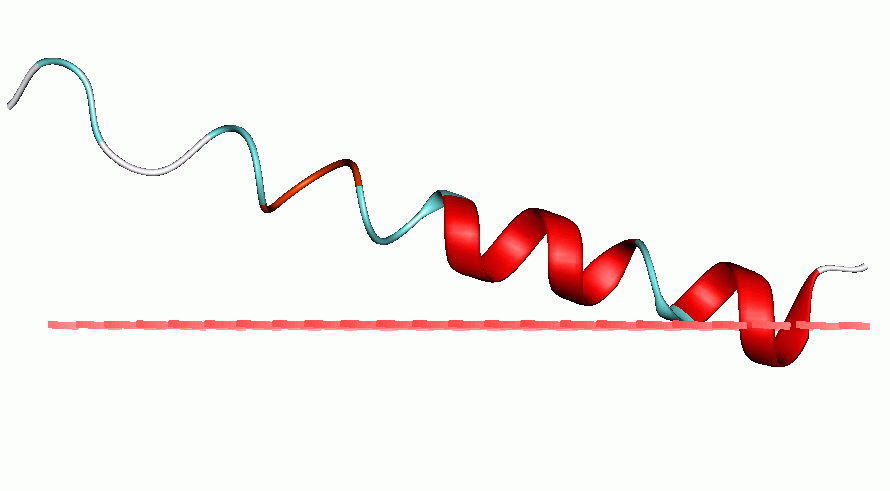
- Glucagon (1gcn)

Identifiers
- Symbol: Hormone_2
- Pfam: PF00123
- InterPro: IPR000532
- PROSITE: PDOC00233
- SCOP2: 1gcn / SCOPe / SUPFAM
- OPM superfamily: 145
- OPM protein: 1gcn
Available protein structures:
- PDB: IPR000532 PF00123 (ECOD; PDBsum)
- AlphaFold: IPR000532; PF00123

Glucagon/gastric inhibitory polypeptide/secretin/vasoactive intestinal peptide hormones are a family of evolutionarily related peptide hormones that regulate activity of G-protein-coupled receptors from the secretin receptor family. A number of polypeptidic hormones, mainly expressed in the intestine or the pancreas, belong to a group of these structurally related peptides.

This family of hormones are produced from (preproglucagon), which is cleaved to produce glucagon, glucagon-like protein I, glucagon-like protein II, and glicentin. Other members of the structurally similar group include secretin, gastric inhibitory peptide, vasoactive intestinal peptide, prealbumin, peptide HI-27, and growth hormone releasing factor.

One hormone, glucagon, is fully conserved in all mammalian species in which it has been studied.

== Human hormones from this family ==
ADCYAP1; GCG; GHRH; GIP; SCT; VIP;
