= Raptin =

Human appetite hormone

Raptin is a recently discovered human hormone produced by the hypothalamus during sleep. It is cleaved from reticulocalbin-2 (RCN2). Raptin binds to glutamate metabotropic receptor 3 (GRM3) in hypothalamus and stomach neurons that inhibit appetite and gastric emptying, respectively. A 2024 study reported that it signals satiety to the gut, curbing appetite. Poor/inadequate sleep reduces raptin levels, increasing appetite. Raptin levels measured lower in people with obesity.

Raptin levels peak during nighttime sleeping and decline during the day.

A 2022 study reported that a lack of sleep increased ghrelin production, increasing appetite, and limits leptin, which disrupts satiety signals.

A genetic study of 2,000 obese individuals led to the discovery of an RCN2 variant, which was present in a group of family members who suffered from Night Eating Syndrome (NES). The variant blocked raptin production, and all individuals with the variant were obese.
