= Somatopause =

Decline in the levels of growth hormone

Somatopause is the progressive decline in the levels of growth hormone (GH) and insulin-like growth factor 1 (IGF-1), hormones of the hypothalamic–pituitary–somatotropic axis (HPS axis), with age. Secretion of GH may only be 60% of that of a young adult by age 70 years. Somatopause results in changes in the body, such as body composition changes like a decrease in lean body mass. Estrogens and progesterone may oppose somatopause by increasing GH and IGF-1 levels.
