= Tesamorelin =

Pharmaceutical drug

Clinical data
- Trade names: Egrifta
- AHFS/Drugs.com: Multum Consumer Information
- MedlinePlus: a611035
- Routes of administration: Subcutaneous injection
- ATC code: H01AC06 (WHO)

Legal status
- Legal status: US: ℞-only; In general: ℞ (Prescription only)

Pharmacokinetic data
- Bioavailability: ≤4%
- Metabolism: Proteolysis
- Elimination half-life: 26–38 min
- Excretion: Renal/proteolysis

Identifiers
- CAS Number: 218949-48-5; as salt: 901758-09-6
- PubChem CID: 16137828
- ChemSpider: 34982925
- UNII: MQG94M5EEO; as salt: LGW5H38VE3
- KEGG: D09015
- ChEBI: CHEBI:63626
- CompTox Dashboard (EPA): DTXSID00583207

Chemical and physical data
- Formula: C_{221}H_{366}N_{72}O_{67}S
- Molar mass: 5135.86 g·mol^{−1}
- 3D model (JSmol): Interactive image
- SMILES: CCC[C@@H](C(=O)N)NC(=O)[C@H](CCCNC(=N)N)NC(=O)[C@H](C)NC(=O)[C@@H](CCCNC(=N)N)NC(=O)[C@H](C)NC(=O)CNC(=O)[C@H](CCCNC(=N)N)NC(=O)[C@H](CCC(=O)O)NC(=O)[C@H](CCC(=O)N)NC(=O)[C@H](CC(=O)N)NC(=O)[C@H](CO)NC(=O)[C@H](CCC(=O)O)NC(=O)CNC(=O)[C@H](CCC(=O)N)NC(=O)[C@H](CCC(=O)N)NC(=O)[C@H](CCCNC(=N)N)NC(=O)[C@H](CO)NC(=O)[C@H](CCSC)NC(=O)[C@H]([C@@H](C)CC)NC(=O)[C@H](CC(=O)O)NC(=O)[C@H](CCC(=O)N)NC(=O)[C@H](CC(C)C)NC(=O)[C@H](CC(C)C)NC(=O)[C@H](CCCCN)NC(=O)[C@H](CCCNC(=N)N)NC(=O)[C@H](C)NC(=O)[C@H](CO)NC(=O)[C@H](CC(C)C)NC(=O)[C@H](CCC(=O)N)NC(=O)CNC(=O)[C@H](CC(C)C)NC(=O)[C@H](C(C)C)NC(=O)[C@H](CCCCN)NC(=O)[C@H](CCCNC(=N)N)NC(=O)[C@H](Cc1ccc(cc1)O)NC(=O)[C@H](CO)NC(=O)[C@H](CC(=O)N)NC(=O)[C@H]([C@@H](C)O)NC(=O)[C@H](Cc2ccccc2)NC(=O)[C@H]([C@@H](C)CC)NC(=O)[C@H](C)NC(=O)[C@H](CC(=O)O)NC(=O)[C@H](C)NC(=O)[C@H](Cc3ccc(cc3)O)NC(=O)C/C=C/CC
- InChI: InChI=1S/C220H364N72O67S/c1-24-28-30-54-162(307)259-144(92-119-55-59-121(298)60-56-119)197(342)254-115(20)178(323)275-149(96-168(315)316)198(343)255-116(21)179(324)290-171(110(15)26-3)213(358)283-146(91-118-44-31-29-32-45-118)205(350)292-173(117(22)297)214(359)284-148(95-161(229)306)204(349)288-154(104-296)209(354)279-145(93-120-57-61-122(299)62-58-120)202(347)267-130(52-41-84-247-219(239)240)186(331)266-126(47-34-36-79-222)196(341)289-170(109(13)14)211(356)282-140(87-105(5)6)182(327)251-100-165(310)257-133(64-71-156(224)301)189(334)277-143(90-108(11)12)201(346)287-151(101-293)207(352)256-114(19)177(322)263-129(51-40-83-246-218(237)238)185(330)265-125(46-33-35-78-221)188(333)276-142(89-107(9)10)200(345)278-141(88-106(7)8)199(344)272-137(67-74-159(227)304)194(339)281-150(97-169(317)318)206(351)291-172(111(16)27-4)212(357)274-139(77-86-360-23)195(340)286-152(102-294)208(353)268-131(53-42-85-248-220(241)242)187(332)270-135(65-72-157(225)302)191(336)269-132(63-70-155(223)300)181(326)250-99-164(309)258-134(68-75-166(311)312)190(335)285-153(103-295)210(355)280-147(94-160(228)305)203(348)273-136(66-73-158(226)303)192(337)271-138(69-76-167(313)314)193(338)264-124(48-37-80-243-215(231)232)180(325)249-98-163(308)252-112(17)175(320)261-127(49-38-81-244-216(233)234)183(328)253-113(18)176(321)262-128(50-39-82-245-217(235)236)184(329)260-123(43-25-2)174(230)319/h28-32,44-45,55-62,105-117,123-154,170-173,293-299H,24-27,33-43,46-54,63-104,221-222H2,1-23H3,(H2,223,300)(H2,224,301)(H2,225,302)(H2,226,303)(H2,227,304)(H2,228,305)(H2,229,306)(H2,230,319)(H,249,325)(H,250,326)(H,251,327)(H,252,308)(H,253,328)(H,254,342)(H,255,343)(H,256,352)(H,257,310)(H,258,309)(H,259,307)(H,260,329)(H,261,320)(H,262,321)(H,263,322)(H,264,338)(H,265,330)(H,266,331)(H,267,347)(H,268,353)(H,269,336)(H,270,332)(H,271,337)(H,272,344)(H,273,348)(H,274,357)(H,275,323)(H,276,333)(H,277,334)(H,278,345)(H,279,354)(H,280,355)(H,281,339)(H,282,356)(H,283,358)(H,284,359)(H,285,335)(H,286,340)(H,287,346)(H,288,349)(H,289,341)(H,290,324)(H,291,351)(H,292,350)(H,311,312)(H,313,314)(H,315,316)(H,317,318)(H4,231,232,243)(H4,233,234,244)(H4,235,236,245)(H4,237,238,246)(H4,239,240,247)(H4,241,242,248)/b30-28+/t110-,111-,112-,113-,114-,115-,116-,117+,123-,124-,125-,126-,127+,128-,129-,130-,131-,132-,133-,134-,135-,136-,137-,138-,139-,140-,141-,142-,143-,144-,145-,146-,147-,148-,149-,150-,151-,152-,153-,154-,170-,171-,172-,173-/m0/s1; Key:VQFDKKWXORFBDI-VAVVJCQZSA-N

Tesamorelin (INN; trade names Egrifta, Egrifta SV and Egrifta WR) is a synthetic form of growth-hormone-releasing hormone (GHRH) which is used in the treatment of HIV-associated lipodystrophy, approved initially in 2010. It is produced and developed by Theratechnologies, Inc. of Canada. The drug is a synthetic peptide consisting of all 44 amino acids of human GHRH with the addition of a trans-3-hexenoic acid group.

== Mechanism of action ==
Tesamorelin is the N-terminally modified compound based on 44 amino acids sequence of human GHRH. This modified synthetic form is more potent and stable than the natural peptide. It is also more resistant to cleavage by the dipeptidyl aminopeptidase than human GHRH. It stimulates the synthesis and release of endogenous GH, with an increase in level of insulin-like growth factor (IGF-1). The released GH then binds with the receptors present on various body organs and regulates the body composition. This regulation is due to the mixing of anabolic and lipolytic mechanisms. However, it has been found that the main mechanisms by which Tesamorelin reduces body fat mass are lipolysis followed by reduction in triglycerides level.

== Contraindication ==
Tesamorelin therapy may cause glucose intolerance and increase the risk of type 2-diabetes, so it is contraindicated in pregnancy. Another reason for contraindication in category X is the fact it may harm the fetus before birth, and in earlier trimesters. It is also contraindicated in patients affected by hypothalamic-pituitary axis disruption due to pituitary gland tumor, head irradiation and hypopituitarism.

== Adverse effects ==
Injection site erythema, peripheral edema, injection site pruritus and diarrhea.With frequent usage, may cause joint, arm, and leg pains, as a result of the depletion of body fat mass upon use.Tesamorelin can also cause a greater risk for lipoatrophy, due to its allowance of prolonged exposure to thymadine NTRI.

== See also ==
- List of growth hormone secretagogues
