= Capromorelin =

Chemical compound

Clinical data
- Trade names: Entyce, Elura, Eluracat
- Other names: CP-424,391
- License data: US DailyMed: Capromorelin
- Routes of administration: By mouth
- ATCvet code: QH01AX90 (WHO)

Legal status
- Legal status: CA: ℞-only; US: ℞-only; EU: Rx-only

Pharmacokinetic data
- Elimination half-life: 2.4 hours

Identifiers
- IUPAC name: N-[(2R)-1-[(3aR)-2-methyl-3-oxo-3a-(phenylmethyl)-6,7-dihydro-4H-pyrazolo[4,3-c]pyridin-5-yl]-1-oxo-3-(phenylmethoxy)propan-2-yl]-2-amino-2-methylpropanamide
- CAS Number: 193273-66-4
- PubChem CID: 216208
- DrugBank: DB15205
- ChemSpider: 187411
- UNII: 0MQ44VUN84
- KEGG: D03373
- ChEMBL: ChEMBL113313
- CompTox Dashboard (EPA): DTXSID5057886

Chemical and physical data
- Formula: C_{28}H_{35}N_{5}O_{4}
- Molar mass: 505.619 g·mol^{−1}
- 3D model (JSmol): Interactive image
- SMILES: CC(C)(C(=O)N[C@H](COCC1=CC=CC=C1)C(=O)N2CCC3=NN(C(=O)[C@@]3(C2)CC4=CC=CC=C4)C)N
- InChI: InChI=1S/C28H35N5O4/c1-27(2,29)25(35)30-22(18-37-17-21-12-8-5-9-13-21)24(34)33-15-14-23-28(19-33,26(36)32(3)31-23)16-20-10-6-4-7-11-20/h4-13,22H,14-19,29H2,1-3H3,(H,30,35)/t22-,28-/m1/s1; Key:KVLLHLWBPNCVNR-SKCUWOTOSA-N

Capromorelin, sold under the brand names Entyce and Elura, is a medication used for the management of weight loss in cats and dogs. Capromorelin is a ghrelin receptor agonist known to increase appetite and weight gain.

Capromorelin was developed by Pfizer.

Capromorelin was approved for veterinary use in the United States in May 2016. It is the second drug approved for the management of weight loss in cats and the first drug approved specifically for the management of weight loss in cats with chronic kidney disease.

== Research ==
Capromorelin functions to stimulate the secretion of growth hormone and as a ghrelin mimetic which causes the body to secrete growth hormone in a way usually seen at puberty and in young adulthood. Studies have shown the drug to directly raise insulin growth factor 1 (IGF-1) and growth hormone levels.

In a one-year treatment trial (starting 1999) with 395 seniors between 65 and 84 years old, patients who received the drug gained an average of 3 lb (1.4 kg) in lean body mass in the first six months and also were better able to walk in a straight line in a test of balance, strength and coordination. After 12 months, patients receiving capromorelin also had an improved ability to climb stairs; however, the results were not good enough to continue the trial for the second planned year.

As of 2017, capromorelin studies in humans had been discontinued.

== Veterinary uses ==
Capromorelin is indicated for the management of weight loss in cats and dogs.
