= Prethcamide =

Respiratory stimulant drug

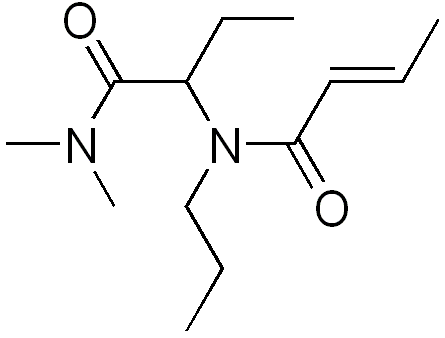

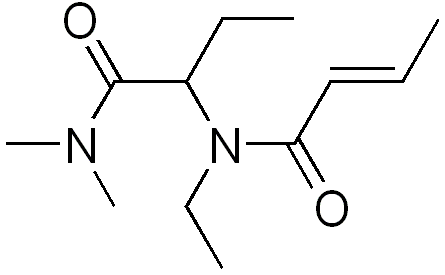

Clinical data
- Trade names: Micoren
- ATC code: R07AB06 (WHO)

Identifiers
- CAS Number: 8015-51-8
- PubChem CID: 71672
- ChemSpider: 5020604
- UNII: 41A1FCW148
- CompTox Dashboard (EPA): DTXSID501001000

Chemical and physical data
- Formula: C_{25}H_{46}N_{4}O_{4}
- Molar mass: 466.667 g·mol^{−1}

Prethcamide, sold under the brand name Micoren, is a respiratory stimulant composed of two related drugs, cropropamide and crotethamide. It was developed by Ciba-Geigy.
