= Chloroamphetamine =

Chloroamphetamine may refer to:

- 2-Chloroamphetamine
- 3-Chloroamphetamine
- 4-Chloroamphetamine
