= Flerobuterol =

Abandoned drug for clinical depression

Clinical data
- Other names: CRL-40827
- Drug class: β-Adrenergic receptor agonist

Identifiers
- IUPAC name: 2-(tert-butylamino)-1-(2-fluorophenyl)ethanol
- CAS Number: 82101-10-8
- PubChem CID: 71254
- ChemSpider: 64385
- UNII: F05RR5M463
- ChEMBL: ChEMBL2106772
- CompTox Dashboard (EPA): DTXSID80868640

Chemical and physical data
- Formula: C_{12}H_{18}FNO
- Molar mass: 211.280 g·mol^{−1}
- 3D model (JSmol): Interactive image
- SMILES: CC(C)(C)NCC(C1=CC=CC=C1F)O
- InChI: InChI=1S/C12H18FNO/c1-12(2,3)14-8-11(15)9-6-4-5-7-10(9)13/h4-7,11,14-15H,8H2,1-3H3; Key:XTJMTDZHCLBKFU-UHFFFAOYSA-N

Flerobuterol (INN; developmental code name CRL-40827) is a selective β-adrenergic receptor agonist related to salbutamol which was under development for the treatment of major depressive disorder but was never marketed. It is an agonist of the β_{1}-, β_{2}-, and β_{3}-adrenergic receptors. The drug was under development in France by Cephalon and Lafon and reached phase 2 clinical trials prior to its development being discontinued. It was first described in the scientific literature by 1988 and its development was terminated in 2007.

== Synthesis ==
The chemical synthesis of flerobuterol was reported:

The halogenation of 2'-fluoroacetophenone [445-27-2] (1) with molecular bromine in acetic acid led to 2-Fluorophenacyl bromide [655-15-2] (2). Alkylation with tert-butylamine [75-64-9] led to 2-(tert-butylamino)-1-(2-fluorophenyl)ethenone, PC13374926 (3). The reduction of the ketone with sodium borohydride led to Flerobuterol (4).
