= Ulimorelin =

Chemical compound

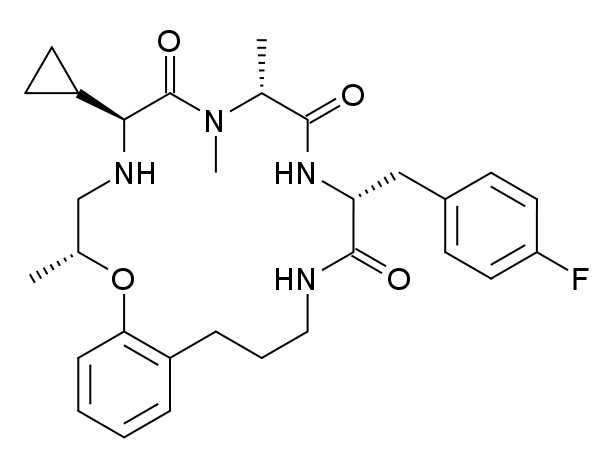

Clinical data
- ATC code: None

Identifiers
- IUPAC name: (7R,10R,13S,16R)-13-cyclopropyl-7-(4-fluorobenzyl)-10,11,16-trimethyl-17-oxa-5,8,11,14-tetrazabicyclo[16.4.0]docosa-1(22),18,20-triene-6,9,12-trione
- CAS Number: 842131-33-3
- PubChem CID: 11526696
- ChemSpider: 9701482
- UNII: LGI67MCW2S
- KEGG: D09981
- CompTox Dashboard (EPA): DTXSID00233139

Chemical and physical data
- Formula: C_{30}H_{39}FN_{4}O_{4}
- Molar mass: 538.664 g·mol^{−1}
- 3D model (JSmol): Interactive image
- SMILES: C[C@@H]1CN[C@H](C(=O)N([C@@H](C(=O)N[C@@H](C(=O)NCCCC2=CC=CC=C2O1)CC3=CC=C(C=C3)F)C)C)C4CC4
- InChI: InChI=1S/C30H39FN4O4/c1-19-18-33-27(23-12-13-23)30(38)35(3)20(2)28(36)34-25(17-21-10-14-24(31)15-11-21)29(37)32-16-6-8-22-7-4-5-9-26(22)39-19/h4-5,7,9-11,14-15,19-20,23,25,27,33H,6,8,12-13,16-18H2,1-3H3,(H,32,37)(H,34,36)/t19-,20-,25-,27+/m1/s1; Key:WGYPAJVJMXQXTR-ABNZCKJZSA-N

Ulimorelin (INN, USAN) (developmental code name TZP-101) is a drug with a modified cyclic peptide structure which acts as a selective agonist of the ghrelin/growth hormone secretagogue receptor (GHSR-1a). Unlike many related drugs, ulimorelin has little or no effect on growth hormone (GH) release in rats. However, like ghrelin and other ghrelin agonists, ulimorelin does stimulate GH release with concomitant increases in insulin-like growth factor 1 (IGF-1) in humans. It has been researched for enhancing gastrointestinal motility, especially in gastroparesis and in aiding recovery of bowel function following gastrointestinal surgery, where opioid analgesic drugs used for post-operative pain relief may worsen existing constipation. While ulimorelin has been shown to increase both upper and lower gastrointestinal motility in rats, and showed promising results initially in humans, it failed in pivotal clinical trials in post operative ileus.

A common side effect of ghrelin is reduced blood pressure. Ulimorelin has been shown to inhibit vasoconstriction of rat arteries in vitro elicited by the α_{1}-adrenoceptors agonists phenylephrine and methoxamine, and to increase artery tension at high concentrations. Effects on blood pressure, however, were not observed in human clinical trials.
