= Hypothalamic–pituitary–somatotropic axis =

Hormone pathway

The hypothalamic–pituitary–somatotropic axis (HPS axis), or hypothalamic–pituitary–somatic axis, also known as the hypothalamic–pituitary–growth axis, is a hypothalamic–pituitary axis which includes the secretion of growth hormone (GH; somatotropin) from the somatotropes of the pituitary gland into the circulation and the subsequent stimulation of insulin-like growth factor 1 (IGF-1; somatomedin-1) production by GH in tissues such as, namely, the liver. Other hypothalamic–pituitary hormones such as growth hormone-releasing hormone (GHRH; somatocrinin), growth hormone-inhibiting hormone (GHIH; somatostatin), and ghrelin (GHS) are involved in the control of GH secretion from the pituitary gland. The HPS axis is involved in postnatal human growth. Individuals with growth hormone deficiency or Laron syndrome (GHR insensitivity) show symptoms like short stature, dwarfism and obesity, but are also protected from some forms of cancer. Conversely, acromegaly and gigantism are conditions of GH and IGF-1 excess usually due to a pituitary tumor, and are characterized by overgrowth and tall stature.

== See also ==
- Somatopause
