= Growth hormone secretagogue receptor =

Protein-coding gene in the species Homo sapiens

GHSR

Identifiers
- Aliases: GHSR, GHDP, growth hormone secretagogue receptor gene, growth hormone secretagogue receptor
- External IDs: OMIM: 601898; MGI: 2441906; GeneCards: GHSR

Gene location (Human)
Chr.	Chromosome 3 (human)
Band	3q26.31	Start	172,443,291 bp
Band	3q26.31	End	172,448,456 bp

Gene location (Mouse)
Chr.	Chromosome 3 (mouse)
Band	3|3 A3	Start	27,425,500 bp
Band	3|3 A3	End	27,432,159 bp
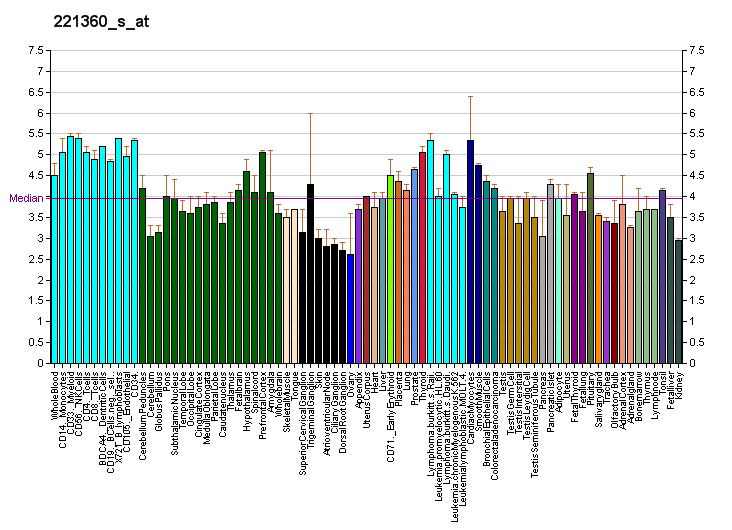
RNA expression pattern
Bgee	Human / Mouse (ortholog); Top expressed in: pituitary gland; islet of Langerhans; anterior pituitary; buccal mucosa cell; granulocyte; cecum; gonad; appendix; hypothalamus; blood / Top expressed in: median eminence; arcuate nucleus; facial motor nucleus; dentate gyrus of hippocampal formation granule cell; mammillary body; ventral tegmental area; primary visual cortex; neural tube; medulla oblongata; spinal cord; More reference expression data
BioGPS	More reference expression data
Gene ontology
Molecular function	hormone binding; signal transducer activity; peptide hormone binding; growth hormone-releasing hormone receptor activity; growth hormone secretagogue receptor activity; G protein-coupled receptor activity
Cellular component	integral component of membrane; membrane; cell surface; neuron projection; membrane raft; plasma membrane; Schaffer collateral - CA1 synapse; postsynapse; glutamatergic synapse; integral component of synaptic membrane
Biological process	negative regulation of interleukin-1 beta production; negative regulation of insulin secretion; regulation of synapse assembly; regulation of hindgut contraction; decidualization; positive regulation of insulin-like growth factor receptor signaling pathway; positive regulation of fatty acid metabolic process; hormone-mediated signaling pathway; positive regulation of multicellular organism growth; cellular response to insulin stimulus; response to food; response to hormone; actin polymerization or depolymerization; negative regulation of inflammatory response; signal transduction; positive regulation of appetite; growth hormone secretion; adult feeding behavior; response to growth hormone; positive regulation of eating behavior; spermatogenesis; female pregnancy; learning or memory; negative regulation of norepinephrine secretion; negative regulation of appetite; response to follicle-stimulating hormone; response to estradiol; ghrelin secretion; regulation of transmission of nerve impulse; regulation of growth hormone secretion; cellular response to lipopolysaccharide; response to dexamethasone; negative regulation of locomotion involved in locomotory behavior; cellular response to thyroid hormone stimulus; positive regulation of sprouting angiogenesis; response to monosodium glutamate; regulation of gastric motility; positive regulation of vascular endothelial cell proliferation; cellular response to insulin-like growth factor stimulus; negative regulation of macrophage apoptotic process; positive regulation of growth; regulation of feeding behavior; positive regulation of small intestinal transit; positive regulation of small intestine smooth muscle contraction; G protein-coupled receptor signaling pathway; regulation of neurotransmitter receptor localization to postsynaptic specialization membrane; postsynaptic modulation of chemical synaptic transmission; regulation of postsynapse organization
Sources:Amigo / QuickGO
Orthologs
Databases	NCBI: entry; OMA: entry
Species	Human	Mouse
Entrez	2693	208188
Ensembl	ENSG00000121853	ENSMUSG00000051136
UniProt	Q92847	Q99P50
RefSeq (mRNA)	NM_198407; NM_004122	NM_177330
RefSeq (protein)	NP_004113; NP_940799	NP_796304
Location (UCSC)	Chr 3: 172.44 – 172.45 Mb	Chr 3: 27.43 – 27.43 Mb
PubMed search
- Wikidata
View/Edit Human	View/Edit Mouse

Growth hormone secretagogue receptor (GHS-R), also known as ghrelin receptor, is a G protein-coupled receptor that binds growth hormone secretagogues (GHSs), such as ghrelin, the "hunger hormone". The role of GHS-R is thought to be in regulating energy homeostasis and body weight. In the brain, they are most highly expressed in the hypothalamus, specifically the ventromedial nucleus and arcuate nucleus. GSH-Rs are also expressed in other areas of the brain, including the ventral tegmental area, hippocampus, and substantia nigra. Outside the central nervous system, too, GHS-Rs are also found in the liver, in skeletal muscle, and even in the heart.

== Structure ==
Two identified transcript variants are expressed in several tissues and are evolutionarily conserved in fish and swine. One transcript, 1a, excises an intron and encodes the functional protein; this protein is the receptor for the ghrelin ligand and defines a neuroendocrine pathway for growth hormone release. The second transcript (1b) retains the intron and does not function as a receptor for ghrelin; however, it may function to attenuate activity of isoform 1a.

GHS-R1a is a member of the G-protein-coupled receptor (GPCR) family. Previous studies have shown that GPCRs can form heterodimers, or functional receptor pairs with other types of G-protein coupled receptors (GPCRs). Various studies suggest that GHS-R1a specifically forms dimers with the following hormone and neurotransmitter receptors: somatostatin receptor 5, dopamine receptor type 2 (DRD2), melanocortin-3 receptor (MC3R), and serotonin receptor type 2C (5-HT_{2c} receptor). See "Function" section below for details on the purported functions of these heterodimers.

== Function ==
=== Growth hormone release ===
The binding of ghrelin to GHS-R1a in pituitary cells stimulates the secretion, but not the synthesis, of growth hormone (GH) by the pituitary gland.

=== Constitutive activity ===
One important feature of GHS-R1a is that there is still some activity in the receptor even when it is not actively being stimulated. This is called constitutive activity, and it means that the receptor is always "on," unless acted on by an inverse agonist. This constitutive activity seems to provide a tonic signal required for the development of normal height, probably through an effect on the GH axis. In fact, some GHS-R1a genetic variations, caused by single nucleotide polymorphisms (SNPs), have been found to be associated with hereditary obesity and others with hereditary short stature. It was also found that, when GHS-R1A constitutive activity was diminished, there were decreased levels of hunger-inducing hormone neuropeptide Y (NPY) as well as in food intake and body weight.

=== Intracellular signaling mechanisms ===
When the growth hormone secretagogue receptor is activated, a variety of different intracellular signaling cascades can result, depending on the cell type in which the receptor is expressed. These intracellular signaling cascades include mitogen-activated protein kinase (MAPK)), protein kinase A (PKA), protein kinase B (PKB), also known as AKT), and AMP Activated Protein Kinase (AMPK) cascades.

=== Behavioral reinforcement of food intake ===
It is well-characterized that activating the growth hormone secretagogue receptor with ghrelin induces an orexigenic state, or general feeling of hunger. However, ghrelin may also play a role in behavioral reinforcement. Studies in animal models, found that food intake increased when ghrelin was specifically administered to just the ventral tegmental area (VTA), a brain area that uses dopamine signaling to reinforce behavior. In fact, the more ghrelin administered, the more food the rodent consumed. This is called a dose-dependent effect. Building on this, it was found that there are growth hormone secretagogue receptors in the VTA and that ghrelin acts on the VTA through these receptors. Current studies, furthermore, suggest that the VTA may contain dimers of GHS-R1a and dopamine receptor type 2 (DRD2). If these two receptors do indeed form dimers, this would somehow link ghrelin signaling to dopaminergic signaling.

=== Enhancement of learning and memory ===
The growth hormone secretagogue receptor may also be linked to learning and memory. First of all, the receptor is found in the hippocampus, the brain region responsible for long-term memory. Second, it was found that specifically activating the receptor in just the hippocampus increased both long-term potentiation (LTP) and dendritic spine density, two cellular phenomena thought to be involved in learning. Third, short-term calorie restriction, defined as a 30% reduction in caloric intake for two weeks, which naturally increases ghrelin levels and thus activates the receptor, was found to increase both performance on spatial learning tasks as well as neurogenesis in the adult hippocampus.

== Selective ligands ==
A range of selective ligands for the GHS-R receptor are now available and are being developed for several clinical applications. GHS-R agonists have appetite-stimulating and growth hormone-releasing effects, and are likely to be useful for the treatment of muscle wasting and frailty associated with old-age and degenerative diseases. On the other hand, GHS-R antagonists have anorectic effects and are likely to be useful for the treatment of obesity.

=== Agonists ===
- Adenosine (increases hunger-related signaling, but does not promote GH secretion)
- Alexamorelin
- Anamorelin
- Capromorelin
- CP-464709
- Cortistatin-14
- Examorelin (hexarelin)
- Ghrelin (lenomorelin)
- GHRP-1
- GHRP-3
- GHRP-4
- GHRP-5
- GHRP-6
- Ibutamoren (MK-677)
- Ipamorelin
- L-692,585
- LY-426410
- LY-444711
- Macimorelin
- Pralmorelin (GHRP-2)
- Relamorelin
- SM-130,686
- Tabimorelin
- Ulimorelin

=== Antagonists ===
- A-778,193
- PF-5190457
