= GHRP-6 =

Chemical compound

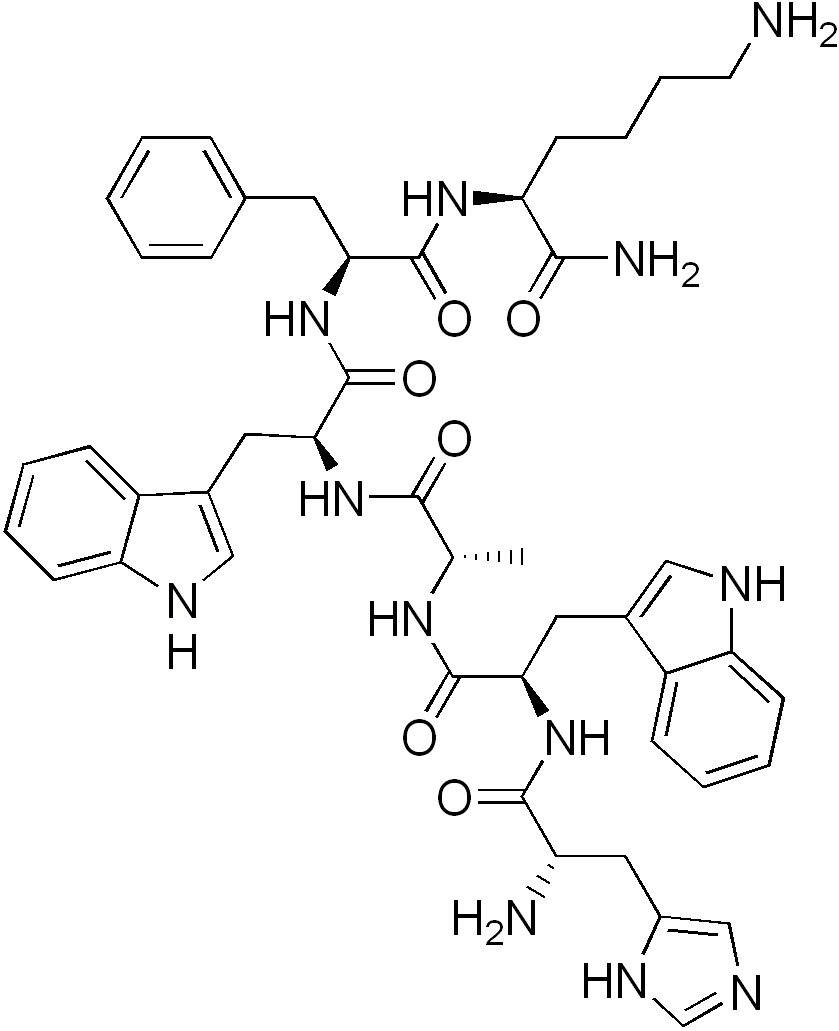

Clinical data
- ATC code: None

Pharmacokinetic data
- Bioavailability: Oral: <1.0%
- Elimination half-life: 2.5 hours

Identifiers
- IUPAC name: L-histidyl-D-tryptophyl-L-alanyl-L-tryptophyl-D-phenylalanyl-L-Lysinamide
- CAS Number: 87616-84-0
- PubChem CID: 5486806
- ChemSpider: 26333269
- UNII: 4H7N4I6X6A
- CompTox Dashboard (EPA): DTXSID30904007

Chemical and physical data
- Formula: C_{46}H_{56}N_{12}O_{6}
- Molar mass: 873.032 g·mol^{−1}
- 3D model (JSmol): Interactive image
- SMILES: C[C@@H](C(=O)N[C@@H](Cc1c[nH]c2c1cccc2)C(=O)N[C@H](Cc3ccccc3)C(=O)N[C@@H](CCCCN)C(=O)N)NC(=O)[C@@H](Cc4c[nH]c5c4cccc5)NC(=O)[C@H](Cc6c[nH]cn6)N
- InChI: InChI=InChI=1S/C46H56N12O6/c1-27(54-44(62)39(20-29-23-51-35-15-7-5-13-32(29)35)57-43(61)34(48)22-31-25-50-26-53-31)42(60)56-40(21-30-24-52-36-16-8-6-14-33(30)36)46(64)58-38(19-28-11-3-2-4-12-28)45(63)55-37(41(49)59)17-9-10-18-47/h2-8,11-16,23-27,34,37-40,51-52H,9-10,17-22,47-48H2,1H3,(H2,49,59)(H,50,53)(H,54,62)(H,55,63)(H,56,60)(H,57,61)(H,58,64)/t27-,34-,37-,38+,39+,40-/m0/s1; Key:WZHKXNSOCOQYQX-FUAFALNISA-N

Growth hormone-releasing peptide 6 (GHRP-6) (developmental code name SKF-110679), also known as growth hormone-releasing hexapeptide, is one of several synthetic met-enkephalin analogues that include unnatural D-amino acids, were developed for their growth hormone-releasing activity and are called growth hormone secretagogues. They lack opioid activity but are potent stimulators of growth hormone (GH) release. These secretagogues are distinct from growth hormone releasing hormone (GHRH) in that they share no sequence relation and derive their function through activation of a completely different receptor. This receptor was originally called the growth hormone secretagogue receptor (GHSR), but due to subsequent discoveries, the hormone ghrelin is now considered the receptor's natural endogenous ligand, and it has been renamed as the ghrelin receptor. Therefore, these GHSR agonists act as synthetic ghrelin mimetics.

It has been discovered that when GHRP-6 and insulin are administered simultaneously, GH response to GHRP-6 is increased (1). However, the consumption of carbohydrates and/or dietary fats, around the administration window of GH secretagogues significantly blunts the GH release. A recent study in normal mice showed significant differences in body composition, muscle growth, glucose metabolism, memory and cardiac function in the mice being administered the GHRP-6 (2). There are still many questions regarding this fairly new compound.

== See also ==
- List of growth hormone secretagogues
