= Appetite =

Desire to eat food

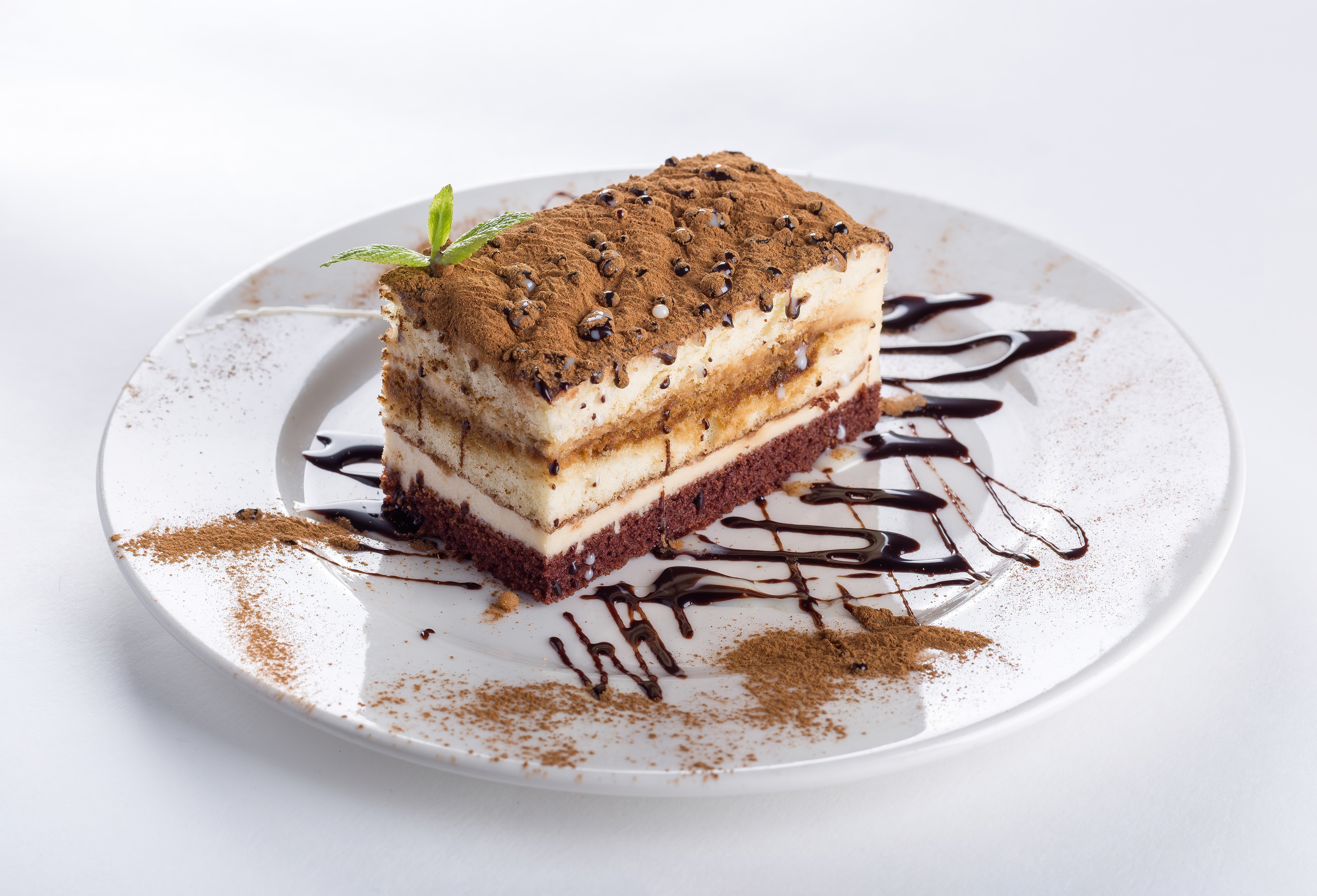
Appealing food may provoke appetite even in the absence of hunger.

Appetite is the desire to eat food items, usually due to hunger. Appealing foods can stimulate appetite even when hunger is absent, although appetite can be greatly reduced by satiety. Appetite exists in all higher life-forms, and serves to regulate adequate energy intake to maintain metabolic needs. It is regulated by a close interplay between the digestive tract, adipose tissue and the brain. Appetite has a relationship with every individual's behavior. Appetitive behaviour, also known as approach behaviour, and consummatory behaviour, are the only processes that involve energy intake, whereas all other behaviours affect the release of energy. When stressed, appetite levels may increase and result in an increase of food intake. Decreased desire to eat is termed anorexia, while polyphagia (or "hyperphagia") is increased eating. Dysregulation of appetite contributes to ARFID, anorexia nervosa, bulimia nervosa, cachexia, overeating, and binge eating disorder.

== Role in disease ==
A limited or excessive appetite is not necessarily pathological. Abnormal appetite could be defined as eating habits causing malnutrition and related conditions such as obesity and its related problems.

Both genetic and environmental factors may regulate appetite, and abnormalities in either may lead to abnormal appetite. Poor appetite (anorexia) can have a number of causes, but may be a result of physical (infectious, autoimmune or malignant disease) or psychological (stress, mental disorders) factors. Likewise, hyperphagia (excessive eating) may be a result of hormonal imbalances, mental disorders (e.g., depression) and others. Dyspepsia, also known as indigestion, can also affect appetite as one of its symptoms is feeling "overly full" soon after beginning a meal. Taste and smell ("dysgeusia", bad taste) or the lack thereof may also affect appetite.

Abnormal appetite may also be linked to genetics on a chromosomal scale, shown by the 1950s discovery of Prader–Willi syndrome, a type of obesity caused by chromosome alterations. Additionally, anorexia nervosa and bulimia nervosa are more commonly found in females than males – thus hinting at a possibility of a linkage to the X-chromosome.

=== Eating disorders ===
Dysregulation of appetite lies at the root of anorexia nervosa, bulimia nervosa, and binge eating disorder. Anorexia nervosa is a mental disorder characterized as severe dietary restriction and intense fear of weight gain. Furthermore, persons with anorexia nervosa may exercise ritualistically. Individuals who have anorexia have high levels of ghrelin, a hormone that stimulates appetite, so the body is trying to cause hunger, but the urge to eat is being suppressed by the person. Binge eating disorder (commonly referred to as BED) is described as eating excessively (or uncontrollably) between periodic time intervals. The risk for BED can be present in children and most commonly manifests during adulthood. Studies suggest that the heritability of BED in adults is approximately 50%. Similarly to bulimia, some people may be involved in purging and binging. They might vomit after food intake or take purgatives. Body dysmorphic disorder may involve food restriction in an attempt to deal with a perceived fault, and may be associated with depression and social isolation.

=== Obesity ===
Various hereditary forms of obesity have been traced to defects in hypothalamic signaling (such as the leptin receptor and the MC-4 receptor) or are still awaiting characterization – Prader-Willi syndrome – in addition, decreased response to satiety may promote development of obesity. It has been found that ghrelin-reactive IgG immunoglobulins affect ghrelin's orexigenic response.

Other than genetically stimulated appetite abnormalities, there are physiological ones that do not require genes for activation. For example, ghrelin and leptin are released from the stomach and adipose cells, respectively, into the blood stream. Ghrelin stimulates feelings of hunger, whereas leptin stimulates feelings of satisfaction from food. Any changes in normal production levels of these two hormones can lead to obesity. The amount of leptin hormone production is stimulated by body fat percentage. When body fat accumulates, there is overproduction of leptin causing a resistant hypothalamus and eventually almost no leptin effect. From then all ghrelin production causes insatiable appetite.

=== Pediatric eating problems ===
Eating issues such as "picky eating" affects about 25% of children, but among children with development disorders this number may be significantly higher, which in some cases may be related to the sounds, smells, and tastes (sensory processing disorder).

== Pharmacology and treatment ==
The glycemic index is thought to affect satiety; however a study investigating the effect of satiety found that the glycemic index of foods did not predict effects on satiety and food intake.

=== Suppression ===
Mechanisms controlling appetite are a potential target for weight loss drugs. Appetite control mechanisms seem to strongly counteract undereating, whereas they appear weak at controlling overeating. Early anorectics (appetite suppressants) were fenfluramine and phentermine. A more recent addition is sibutramine which increases serotonin and noradrenaline levels in the central nervous system, but had to be withdrawn from the market when it was shown to have an adverse cardiovascular risk profile. Similarly, the appetite suppressant rimonabant (a cannabinoid receptor antagonist) had to be withdrawn when it was linked with worsening depression and increased risk of suicide. Recent reports on recombinant PYY 3-36 suggest that this agent may contribute to weight loss by suppressing appetite.

Given the epidemic proportions of obesity in the Western world and the fact that it is increasing rapidly in some poorer countries, observers expect developments in this area to snowball in the near future.

=== Stimulation ===
Weight loss or loss of appetite ("cachexia") is an effect of some diseases, and a side effect of some prescription drugs. Stimulants such as methylphenidate commonly reduce appetite in patients, and have been prescribed off-label for weight loss. Three agents are approved for appetite stimulation in the United States: megestrol acetate - a progesterone available as an oral tablet, oxandrolone - an oral anabolic steroid, and dronabinol - THC, the principal cannabinoid in marijuana, available in an oral capsule.

Ghrelin, a gut hormone recognized as affecting appetite, is under investigation. Ghrelin itself must be delivered parenterally and research has therefore focused on substances that can be taken orally. Rikkunshito, a traditional Japanese Kampo medicine, is under preliminary research for its potential to stimulate ghrelin and appetite.

== See also ==
- Satiety value
- Specific appetite
- Orexigenic
- Adipsia
