= Ibutamoren =

Experimental drug

Clinical data
- Other names: MK-677; MK-0677; L-163,191; Oratrope
- Routes of administration: By mouth

Legal status
- Legal status: Investigational New Drug

Pharmacokinetic data
- Elimination half-life: 4–6 hours (in beagles); IGF-1 levels remain elevated in humans with a single oral dose for up to 24 hours

Identifiers
- IUPAC name: 2-amino-2-methyl-N-[1-(1-methylsulfonylspiro[2H-indole-3,4'-piperidine]-1'-yl)-1-oxo-3-phenylmethoxypropan-2-yl]propanamide
- CAS Number: 159634-47-6 159752-10-0 (mesylate)
- PubChem CID: 9939050
- IUPHAR/BPS: 5867
- DrugBank: DB18214
- ChemSpider: 154975
- UNII: GJ0EGN38UL
- ChEMBL: ChEMBL13817
- CompTox Dashboard (EPA): DTXSID90166700
- ECHA InfoCard: 100.236.734

Chemical and physical data
- Formula: C_{27}H_{36}N_{4}O_{5}S
- Molar mass: 528.67 g·mol^{−1}
- 3D model (JSmol): Interactive image
- SMILES: O=S(C)(=O)N(C2)c1ccccc1C23CCN(CC3)C(=O)C(NC(=O)C(N)(C)C)COCc4ccccc4
- InChI: InChI=1S/C27H36N4O5S/c1-26(2,28)25(33)29-22(18-36-17-20-9-5-4-6-10-20)24(32)30-15-13-27(14-16-30)19-31(37(3,34)35)23-12-8-7-11-21(23)27/h4-12,22H,13-19,28H2,1-3H3,(H,29,33)/t22-/m1/s1; Key:UMUPQWIGCOZEOY-JOCHJYFZSA-N

Ibutamoren (INN; developmental code MK-677, MK-0677, LUM-201, L-163,191; former tentative brand name Oratrope) is a potent, long-acting, orally-active, selective, and non-peptide agonist of the ghrelin receptor and a growth hormone secretagogue, mimicking the growth hormone (GH)-stimulating action of the endogenous hormone ghrelin. It has been shown to increase the secretion of several hormones including GH and insulin-like growth factor 1 (IGF-1) and produces sustained increases in the plasma levels of these hormones while also raising cortisol levels.

== Effect on lean mass ==
Ibutamoren has been shown to sustain activation of the GH–IGF-1 axis, increasing growth hormone secretion by up to 97%, and to increase lean body mass with no change in total fat mass or visceral fat. It is under investigation as a potential treatment for reduced levels of these hormones, such as in children or elderly adults with growth hormone deficiency, and human studies have shown it to increase both muscle mass and bone mineral density, making it a promising potential therapy for the treatment of frailty in the elderly. As of June 2017, ibutamoren is in the preclinical stage of development for growth hormone deficiency.

== Effect on sleep architecture ==
In a small study of 14 subjects, ibutamoren dosed at 25 mg/day at bedtime was shown to increase rapid eye movement sleep by 20% and 50% in young and older subjects respectively. Treatment with ibutamoren also resulted in an approximate 50% increase in slow-wave sleep in young subjects.

== Growth hormone deficiency ==
In a study of children with growth hormone deficiency, ibutamoren performed better than other growth hormone secretagogues at improving growth hormone levels. An ongoing study compares ibutamoren directly to injectable hGH in terms of height velocity in this population. Topline data from Phase 2 OraGrowtH210 and OraGrowtH212 Trials of LUM-201 in PGHD met all primary and secondary endpoints.

== Non-research use ==
Since ibutamoren is still an Investigational New Drug, it has not yet been approved to be marketed for consumption by humans in the United States. However, it has been used experimentally by some in the bodybuilding community. The use of ibutamoren is banned in most sports.

== See also ==
- List of growth hormone secretagogues
- Ghrelin
