= Growth hormone–releasing hormone =

Mammalian protein found in Homo sapiens

GHRH

Identifiers
- Aliases: GHRH, GHRF, GRF, INN, growth hormone releasing hormone
- External IDs: OMIM: 139190; MGI: 95709; GeneCards: GHRH
Available structures
PDB	Ortholog search: PDBe RCSB
PDB	List of PDB id codes 5BQM

Gene location (Mouse)
Chr.	Chromosome 2 (mouse)
Band	2 H1|2 78.25 cM	Start	157,171,417 bp
Band	2 H1|2 78.25 cM	End	157,189,426 bp
Gene ontology
Molecular function	growth hormone-releasing hormone receptor binding; growth hormone-releasing hormone activity; hormone activity; neuropeptide hormone activity; peptide hormone receptor binding
Cellular component	extracellular region; terminal bouton; intracellular anatomical structure; extracellular space; neuron projection; perikaryon; axon terminus
Biological process	response to food; cell-cell signaling; positive regulation of insulin-like growth factor receptor signaling pathway; growth hormone secretion; adenohypophysis development; positive regulation of circadian sleep/wake cycle, REM sleep; positive regulation of growth hormone secretion; positive regulation of hormone secretion; positive regulation of cell population proliferation; positive regulation of multicellular organism growth; regulation of signaling receptor activity; G protein-coupled receptor signaling pathway; adenylate cyclase-activating G protein-coupled receptor signaling pathway; response to hypoxia; positive regulation of cytosolic calcium ion concentration; negative regulation of cardiac muscle cell apoptotic process; positive regulation of insulin secretion; circadian sleep/wake cycle, non-REM sleep; response to leptin; positive regulation of transcription, DNA-templated; positive regulation of circadian sleep/wake cycle, non-REM sleep; cellular response to calcium ion; cellular response to interleukin-6; response to dexamethasone; positive regulation of lactation
Sources:Amigo / QuickGO
Orthologs
Databases	NCBI: entry; OMA: entry
Species	Human	Mouse
Entrez	2691	14601
Ensembl	ENSG00000118702	ENSMUSG00000027643
UniProt	P01286	P16043
RefSeq (mRNA)	NM_001184731; NM_021081	NM_010285; NM_001329683
RefSeq (protein)	NP_001171660; NP_066567	NP_001316612; NP_034415
Location (UCSC)	n/a	Chr 2: 157.17 – 157.19 Mb
PubMed search
- Wikidata
View/Edit Human	View/Edit Mouse

Growth hormone–releasing hormone (GHRH), also known as somatocrinin among other names in its endogenous form and as somatorelin (INN) in its pharmaceutical form, is a releasing hormone of growth hormone (GH). It is a 44-amino acid peptide hormone produced in the arcuate nucleus of the hypothalamus.

GHRH first appears in the human hypothalamus between 18 and 29 weeks of gestation, which corresponds to the start of production of growth hormone and other somatotropes in fetuses.

== Nomenclature ==
- Endogenous:
  - somatocrinin
  - somatoliberin
  - growth hormone–releasing hormone (GHRH or GH-RH; HGNC symbol is GHRH)
  - growth hormone–releasing factor (GHRF or GRF)
  - somatotropin-releasing hormone (SRH)
  - somatotropin-releasing factor (SRF)
- Pharmaceutical:
  - somatorelin (INN)

== Origin ==
GHRH is released from neurosecretory nerve terminals of these arcuate neurons, and is carried by the hypothalamo-hypophyseal portal system to the anterior pituitary gland, where it stimulates growth hormone (GH) secretion by stimulating the growth hormone-releasing hormone receptor. GHRH is released in a pulsatile manner, stimulating similar pulsatile release of GH. In addition, GHRH promotes slow-wave sleep directly. Growth hormone is required for normal postnatal growth, bone growth, regulatory effects on protein, carbohydrate, and lipid metabolism.

== Effect ==
GHRH stimulates GH production and release by binding to the GHRH receptor (GHRHR) on cells in the anterior pituitary.

=== Receptor ===
The GHRHR is a member of the secretin family of G protein-coupled receptors, and is located on chromosome 7 in humans. This protein is transmembranous with seven folds, and its molecular weight is approximately 44 kD.

=== Signal transduction ===
GHRH binding to GHRHR results in increased GH production mainly by the cAMP-dependent pathway, but also by the phospholipase C pathway (IP_{3}/DAG pathway), and other minor pathways.

The cAMP-dependent pathway is initiated by the binding of GHRH to its receptor, causing receptor conformation that activates G_{s} alpha subunit of the closely associated G-Protein complex on the intracellular side. This results in stimulation of membrane-bound adenylyl cyclase and increased intracellular cyclic adenosine monophosphate (cAMP). cAMP binds to and activates the regulatory subunits of protein kinase A (PKA), allowing the free catalytic subunits to translocate to the nucleus and phosphorylate the transcription factor cAMP response element-binding protein (CREB). Phosphorylated CREB, together with its coactivators, p300 and CREB-binding protein (CBP) enhances the transcription of GH by binding to CREs cAMP-response elements in the promoter region of the GH gene. It also increases transcription of the GHRHR gene, providing positive feedback.

In the phospholipase C pathway, GHRH stimulates phospholipase C (PLC) through the βγ-complex of heterotrimeric G-proteins. PLC activation produces both diacylglycerol (DAG) and inositol triphosphate (IP_{3}), the latter leading to release of intracellular Ca^{2+} from the endoplasmic reticulum, increasing cytosolic Ca^{2+} concentration, resulting in vesicle fusion and release of secretory vesicles containing premade growth hormone.

Some Ca^{2+} influx is also a direct action of cAMP, which is distinct from the usual cAMP-dependent pathway of activating protein kinase A.

Activation of GHRHRs by GHRH also conveys opening of Na+ channels by phosphatidylinositol 4,5-bisphosphate, causing cell depolarization. The resultant change in the intracellular voltage opens a voltage-dependent calcium channel, resulting in vesicle fusion and release of GH.

== Relationship of GHRH and somatostatin ==
The actions of GHRH are opposed by somatostatin (growth-hormone-inhibiting hormone). Somatostatin is released from neurosecretory nerve terminals of periventricular somatostatin neurons, and is carried by the hypothalamo-hypophyseal portal circulation to the anterior pituitary where it inhibits GH secretion. Somatostatin and GHRH are secreted in alternation, giving rise to the markedly pulsatile secretion of GH.

== Other functions ==
GHRH expression has been demonstrated in peripheral cells and tissues outside its main site in the hypothalamus, for example, in the pancreas, epithelial mucosa of the gastrointestinal tract and, pathologically, in tumour cells.

== Sequence ==
The amino acid sequence (44 long) of human GHRH is:

HO - Tyr - Ala - Asp - Ala - Ile - Phe - Thr - Asn - Ser - Tyr - Arg - Lys - Val - Leu - Gly - Gln - Leu - Ser - Ala - Arg - Lys - Leu - Leu - Gln - Asp - Ile - Met - Ser - Arg - Gln - Gln - Gly - Glu - Ser - Asn - Gln - Glu - Arg - Gly - Ala - Arg - Ala - Arg - Leu - NH_{2}

== Analogs ==
Growth-hormone-releasing hormone is the lead compound for a number of structural and functional analogs, such as Pro-Pro-hGHRH(1-44)-Gly-Gly-Cys, CJC-1293, and CJC-1295.

Many GHRH analogs remain primarily research chemicals, although some have specific applications. Sermorelin, a functional peptide fragment of GHRH, has been used in the diagnosis of deficiencies in growth hormone secretion. Tesamorelin, under the trade name Egrifta, received U.S. Food and Drug Administration approval in 2010 for the treatment of lipodystrophy in HIV patients under highly active antiretroviral therapy, and, in 2011, was investigated for effects on certain cognitive tests in the elderly. As a category, the use of GHRH analogs by professional athletes may be prohibited by restrictions on doping in sport because they act as growth hormone secretagogues.

== See also ==
- Growth hormone secretagogue
- Hypothalamic–pituitary–somatic axis
- List of growth hormone secretagogues
