= Pralmorelin =

Chemical compound

Clinical data
- Other names: D-Alanyl-3-(naphthalen-2-yl)-D-alanyl-L-alanyl-L-tryptophyl-D-phenylalanyl-L-lysinamide
- Routes of administration: Oral, intravenous

Identifiers
- IUPAC name: (2S)-6-Amino-2-[[(2S)-2-[[(2S)-2-[[(2S)-2-[[(2R)-2-[[(2R)-2-aminopropanoyl]amino]-3-naphthalen-2-ylpropanoyl]amino]propanoyl]amino]-3-(1H-indol-3-yl)propanoyl]amino]-3-phenylpropanoyl]amino]hexanamide
- CAS Number: 158861-67-7
- PubChem CID: 6852372
- IUPHAR/BPS: 1092
- ChemSpider: 5293451
- UNII: E6S6E1F19M
- CompTox Dashboard (EPA): DTXSID601032404

Chemical and physical data
- Formula: C_{45}H_{55}N_{9}O_{6}
- Molar mass: 817.992 g·mol^{−1}
- 3D model (JSmol): Interactive image
- SMILES: C[C@H](C(=O)N[C@H](CC1=CC2=CC=CC=C2C=C1)C(=O)N[C@@H](C)C(=O)N[C@@H](CC3=CNC4=CC=CC=C43)C(=O)N[C@H](CC5=CC=CC=C5)C(=O)N[C@@H](CCCCN)C(=O)N)N
- InChI: InChI=1S/C45H55N9O6/c1-27(47)41(56)52-38(24-30-19-20-31-14-6-7-15-32(31)22-30)43(58)50-28(2)42(57)53-39(25-33-26-49-35-17-9-8-16-34(33)35)45(60)54-37(23-29-12-4-3-5-13-29)44(59)51-36(40(48)55)18-10-11-21-46/h3-9,12-17,19-20,22,26-28,36-39,49H,10-11,18,21,23-25,46-47H2,1-2H3,(H2,48,55)(H,50,58)(H,51,59)(H,52,56)(H,53,57)(H,54,60)/t27-,28+,36+,37-,38-,39+/m1/s1; Key:HRNLPPBUBKMZMT-RDRUQFPZSA-N

Pralmorelin (INN; brand name GHRP Kaken 100; former developmental codes KP-102, GPA-748, and WAY-GPA-748; also known as pralmorelin hydrochloride (JAN), pralmorelin dihydrochloride (USAN), growth hormone-releasing peptide 2, and GHRP-2) is a growth hormone secretagogue (GHS) used as a diagnostic agent that is marketed by Kaken Pharmaceutical in Japan in a single-dose formulation for the assessment of growth hormone deficiency (GHD).

Pralmorelin is an orally-active, synthetic peptide drug, specifically, an analogue of met-enkephalin, with the amino acid sequence D-Ala-D-(β-naphthyl)-Ala-Trp-D-Phe-Lys-NH_{2}. It acts as a ghrelin/growth hormone secretagogue receptor (GHSR) agonist, and was the first of this class of drugs to be introduced clinically. Acute administration of the drug markedly increases the levels of plasma growth hormone (GH) and reliably induces sensations of hunger and increases food intake in humans.

Pralmorelin was also under investigation for the treatment of GHD and short stature (pituitary dwarfism), and made it to phase II clinical trials for these indications, but was ultimately never marketed for them. This may be because the ability of pralmorelin to increase plasma GH levels is significantly lower in people with GHD relative to healthy individuals.

== See also ==
- List of growth hormone secretagogues
