= Ghrelin =

Peptide hormone involved in appetite regulation

GHRL
Available structures
PDB	Ortholog search: PDBe RCSB
PDB	List of PDB id codes 1P7X,%%s2JSH, 2JSI, 2JSJ

Identifiers
- Aliases: GHRL, ghrelin, Ghrelin, ghrelin and obestatin prepropeptide, MTLRP
- External IDs: OMIM: 605353; MGI: 1930008; HomoloGene: 9487; GeneCards: GHRL; OMA:GHRL - orthologs

Gene location (Human)
Chr.	Chromosome 3 (human)
Band	3p25.3	Start	10,285,666 bp
Band	3p25.3	End	10,292,947 bp

Gene location (Mouse)
Chr.	Chromosome 6 (mouse)
Band	6 E3|6 52.84 cM	Start	113,693,080 bp
Band	6 E3|6 52.84 cM	End	113,696,841 bp
RNA expression pattern
Bgee	Human / Mouse (ortholog); Top expressed in: cardia; body of stomach; pancreatic epithelial cell; fundus; bone marrow cell; pancreatic ductal cell; islet of Langerhans; duodenum; testicle; blood / Top expressed in: epithelium of stomach; pyloric antrum; mucous cell of stomach; duodenum; neural layer of retina; spermatid; embryo; embryo; spermatocyte; migratory enteric neural crest cell; More reference expression data
BioGPS	n/a
Gene ontology
Molecular function	protein tyrosine kinase activator activity; hormone activity; protein binding; ghrelin receptor binding; G protein-coupled receptor binding; growth hormone-releasing hormone activity
Cellular component	postsynapse; cytoplasm; endoplasmic reticulum lumen; extracellular region; axon; secretory granule lumen; extracellular space; Schaffer collateral - CA1 synapse; glutamatergic synapse
Biological process	positive regulation of appetite; G protein-coupled receptor signaling pathway; positive regulation of cortisol secretion; positive regulation of growth hormone receptor signaling pathway; negative regulation of insulin secretion; gastric acid secretion; positive regulation of cytosolic calcium ion concentration; dendrite development; regulation of response to food; negative regulation of apoptotic process; positive regulation of corticotropin secretion; negative regulation of locomotion; cortisol secretion; response to estrogen; negative regulation of endothelial cell proliferation; positive regulation of circadian sleep/wake cycle, non-REM sleep; cartilage development; decidualization; regulation of cell population proliferation; growth hormone secretion; positive regulation of growth hormone secretion; excitatory postsynaptic potential; hormone-mediated signaling pathway; glucose metabolic process; positive regulation of multicellular organism growth; negative regulation of angiogenesis; response to hormone; actin polymerization or depolymerization; positive regulation of response to food; negative regulation of circadian sleep/wake cycle, REM sleep; negative regulation of inflammatory response; positive regulation of insulin secretion; positive regulation of synapse assembly; positive regulation of protein tyrosine kinase activity; adult feeding behavior; response to nutrient levels; positive regulation of eating behavior; positive regulation of adipose tissue development; negative regulation of interleukin-1 beta production; gastric emptying; positive regulation of insulin secretion involved in cellular response to glucose stimulus; positive regulation of growth; response to electrical stimulus; regulation of transmission of nerve impulse; positive regulation of bone development; positive regulation of sprouting angiogenesis; positive regulation of gastro-intestinal system smooth muscle contraction; positive regulation of small intestine smooth muscle contraction; regulation of gastric motility; positive regulation of vascular endothelial cell proliferation; positive regulation of growth rate; positive regulation of small intestinal transit; positive regulation of gastric mucosal blood circulation; positive regulation of feeding behavior; regulation of signaling receptor activity; energy homeostasis; postsynaptic modulation of chemical synaptic transmission; regulation of postsynapse organization; positive regulation of cold-induced thermogenesis
Sources:Amigo / QuickGO
Orthologs
Species	Human	Mouse
Entrez	51738	58991
Ensembl	ENSG00000157017	ENSMUSG00000064177
UniProt	Q9UBU3	Q9EQX0
RefSeq (mRNA)	NM_001134941; NM_001134944; NM_001134945; NM_001134946; NM_001302821 NM_001302822; NM_001302823; NM_001302824; NM_001302825; NM_016362	NM_021488; NM_001286404; NM_001286405; NM_001286406; NM_001379129
RefSeq (protein)	NP_001128413; NP_001128416; NP_001128417; NP_001128418; NP_001289750 NP_001289751; NP_001289752; NP_001289753; NP_001289754; NP_057446; NP_001128413; NP_001128416; NP_001128417; NP_001128418; NP_001289750; NP_001289751; NP_001289752; NP_001289753; NP_001289754; NP_057446	NP_001273333; NP_001273334; NP_001273335; NP_067463; NP_001366058
Location (UCSC)	Chr 3: 10.29 – 10.29 Mb	Chr 6: 113.69 – 113.7 Mb
PubMed search
- Wikidata
View/Edit Human	View/Edit Mouse

Ghrelin (/ˈɡrɛlɪn/; or lenomorelin, INN) is a hormone primarily produced by enteroendocrine cells of the gastrointestinal tract, especially the stomach, and is also dubbed the "hunger hormone" because it increases the drive to eat. Blood levels of ghrelin are highest before meals when hungry, returning to lower levels after mealtimes. Ghrelin may help prepare for food intake by increasing gastric motility and stimulating the secretion of gastric acid.

Ghrelin activates cells in the anterior pituitary gland and hypothalamic arcuate nucleus, including neuropeptide Y neurons that initiate appetite. Ghrelin stimulates brain structures having a specific receptor – the growth hormone secretagogue receptor 1A (GHSR-1A). Ghrelin also participates in regulation of reward cognition, learning and memory, the sleep-wake cycle, taste sensation, reward behavior, and glucose metabolism.

== History and name ==
Ghrelin was discovered after the ghrelin receptor (called growth hormone secretagogue type 1A receptor or GHS-R) was determined in 1999. The hormone name is based on its role as a growth hormone-releasing peptide, with reference to the Proto-Indo-European root gʰre-, meaning "to grow".

== Gene, transcription products, and structure ==
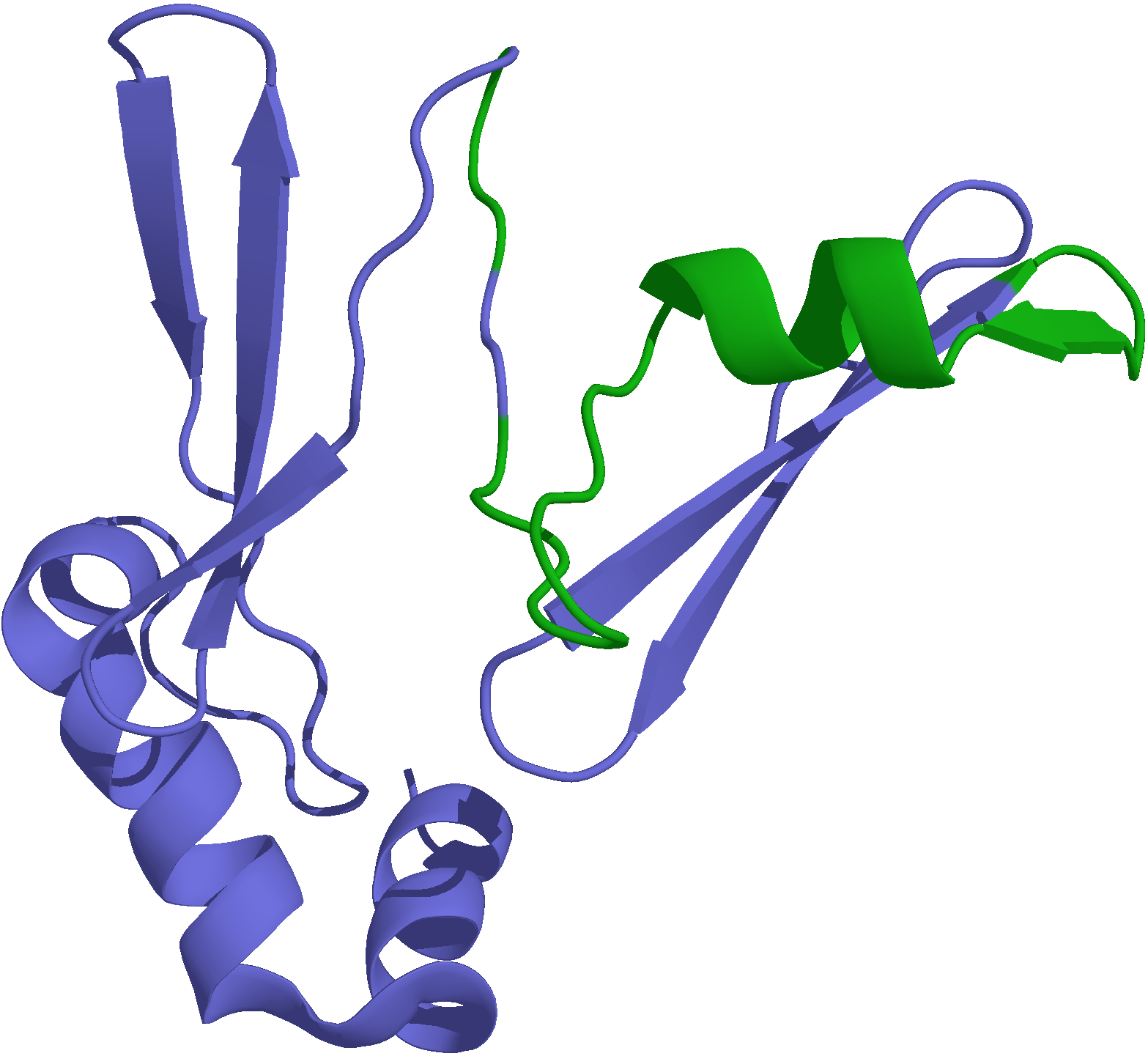
Preproghrelin (green and blue) and ghrelin (green)

The GHRL gene produces mRNA which has four exons. Five products arise: the first is the 117-amino acid preproghrelin. It is homologous to promotilin; both are members of the motilin family. It is cleaved to produce proghrelin which is cleaved to produce an unacylated 28-amino acid ghrelin and an acylated C-ghrelin. Obestatin is presumed to be cleaved from C-ghrelin.

Ghrelin only becomes active when caprylic (octanoic) acid is linked posttranslationally to serine at the 3-position by the enzyme ghrelin O-acyltransferase (GOAT) to form a proteolipid. It is located on the cell membrane of ghrelin cells in the stomach and pancreas. The non-octanoylated form is desacyl ghrelin. It does not activate the GHS-R receptor but does have other effects: cardiac, anti-ghrelin, appetite stimulation, and inhibition of hepatic glucose output. Side-chains other than octanoyl have also been observed: these can also trigger the ghrelin receptor. In particular, decanoyl ghrelin has been found to constitute a significant portion of circulating ghrelin in mice, but as of 2011 its presence in humans has not been established.

== Ghrelin cells ==
=== Alternative names ===
The ghrelin cell is also known as an A-like cell (pancreas), X-cell (for unknown function), X/A-like cell (rats), Epsilon cell (pancreas), P/D sub 1 cell (humans) and Gr cell (abbreviation for ghrelin cell).

=== Location ===
Ghrelin cells are found mainly in the stomach and duodenum, but also in the jejunum, lungs, pancreatic islets, gonads, adrenal cortex, placenta, and kidney. It has also been shown that ghrelin is produced locally in the brain. Additionally, research suggests that ghrelin may be produced in the myocardium and have an 'autocrine/ paracrine' like effect within the heart.

Ghrelin cells are also found in oxyntic glands (20% of cells), pyloric glands, and small intestine.

=== Features ===
They are ovoid cells with granules. They have gastrin receptors. Some produce nesfatin-1. Ghrelin cells are not terminally differentiated in the pancreas: they are progenitor cells that can give rise to A-cells, PP cells and Beta-cells there.

== Function and mechanism of action ==
Ghrelin is a participant in regulating the complex process of energy homeostasis which adjusts both energy input – by adjusting hunger signals – and energy output – by adjusting the proportion of energy going to ATP production, fat storage, glycogen storage, and short-term heat loss. The net result of these processes is reflected in body weight, and is under continuous monitoring and adjustment based on metabolic signals and needs. At any given moment in time, it may be in equilibrium or disequilibrium. Gastric-brain communication is an essential part of energy homeostasis, and several communication pathways are probable, including the gastric intracellular mTOR/S6K1 pathway mediating the interaction among ghrelin, nesfatin and endocannabinoid gastric systems, and both afferent and efferent vagal signals.

Ghrelin and synthetic ghrelin mimetics (growth hormone secretagogues) increase body weight and fat mass by triggering receptors in the arcuate nucleus that include neuropeptide Y (NPY) and agouti-related protein (AgRP) neurons. Ghrelin-responsiveness of these neurons is both leptin- and insulin-sensitive. Ghrelin reduces the sensitivity of gastric vagal afferents, so they are less sensitive to gastric distension.

In addition to its function in energy homeostasis, ghrelin also activates the cholinergic–dopaminergic reward link in inputs to the ventral tegmental area and in the mesolimbic pathway, a circuit that communicates the hedonic and reinforcing aspects of natural rewards, such as food and addictive drugs such as ethanol. Ghrelin receptors are located on neurons in this circuit. Hypothalamic ghrelin signalling is required for reward from alcohol and palatable/rewarding foods.

Ghrelin has been linked to inducing appetite and feeding behaviors. Circulating ghrelin levels are the highest right before a meal and the lowest right after. Injections of ghrelin in both humans and rats have been shown to increase food intake in a dose-dependent manner. So the more ghrelin that is injected the more food that is consumed. However, ghrelin does not increase meal size, only meal number. Ghrelin injections also increase an animal's motivation to seek out food, behaviors including increased sniffing, foraging for food, and hoarding food. Body weight is regulated through energy balance, the amount of energy taken in versus the amount of energy expended over an extended period of time. Studies have shown that ghrelin levels are positively correlated with weight. This data suggests that ghrelin functions as an adiposity signal, a messenger between the body's energy stores and the brain.

Ghrelin is not produced by some groups of animals. Among reptiles, snakes, chameleons and toadhead agamas have either lost the genes to produce ghrelin or the gene has become so mutated that it can no longer give rise to the protein hormone. A second gene, for MBOAT4 involved in ghrelin signalling is also absent. These animals can go for long periods without eating and commonly have their meals spaced weeks, months or even years apart. It appears that this gene loss has happened several times independently in evolutionary separated groups of animals. Lack of ghrelin and MBOAT4 may be relevant to the way that these reptiles can live at a low energy demand for months or years. Their fat stores are used at a low level. The presence of many mutations in genes for aspects of mitochondrial function in these animals may also be involved in their reduced energy demand.

== Blood levels ==
Blood levels are in the pmol/L or fmol/mL range. Both active and total ghrelin can be measured. Circulating ghrelin concentrations rise before eating and fall afterward, more strongly in response to protein and carbohydrate than to lipids. The plasma ghrelin-like immunoreactivity concentration measured with a particular radioimmunoassay in a typical human is 166.0 + 10.1 fmol/mL. Serum ghrelin concentrations tend to increase in age and vary throughout the day, with values peaking while one is asleep.

== Ghrelin receptor ==
The ghrelin receptor GHS-R1a (a splice-variant of the growth hormone secretagogue receptor, with the GHS-R1b splice being inactive) is involved in mediating a wide variety of biological effects of ghrelin, including: stimulation of growth hormone release, increase in hunger, modulation of glucose and lipid metabolism, regulation of gastrointestinal motility and secretion, protection of neuronal and cardiovascular cells, and regulation of immune function. They are present in high density in the hypothalamus and pituitary, on the vagus nerve (on both afferent cell bodies and efferent nerve endings) and throughout the gastrointestinal tract.

== Locations of action ==
=== Glucose metabolism ===
The entire ghrelin system (dAG, AG, GHS-R and GOAT) has a gluco-regulatory action.

=== Sleep ===
Preliminary research indicates that ghrelin participates in the regulation of circadian rhythms. A review reported finding strong evidence that sleep restriction affected ghrelin or leptin levels, or energy expenditure.

=== Reproductive system ===
Ghrelin has inhibitory effects on gonadotropin-releasing hormone (GnRH) secretion. It may cause decreased fertility.

=== Fetus and neonate ===
Ghrelin is produced early by the fetal lung and promotes lung growth. Umbilical cord blood levels of ghrelin show a correlation between ghrelin levels and birth weight.

=== Cardiovascular system ===
Ghrelin functions as a cardio-protective peptide by being an anti-inflammatory agent, promoting angiogenesis, inhibiting arrhythmia, and improving heart failure.

=== Immune system ===
Ghrelin has a diverse immunoregulatory role mediating the release of anti-inflammatory cytokines such as IL-4 and 10 along with TGF-β while reducing pro-inflammatory cytokines such as TNF-α, INF-γ, and IL-1β from various immunologically competent cells in vitro and in vivo. Additionally, Ghrelin and its endogenous receptor, GHSR1a, along with GOAT are expressed in primary immune tissues such as the spleen and thymus where it has a role in modulating interactions between metabolic state and inflammation, mediating energy balance homeostasis.

=== Stress/ Hypothalamic-pituitary-adrenal (HPA) axis ===
GHSR1A, Ghrelin's endogenous receptor, is expressed within the hypothalamus including the arcuate nucleus, but not in the paraventricular nucleus (PVN) where ghrelin has been found to indirectly affect HPA axis function via neighboring corticotropin releasing hormone (CRH) neurons. Studies regarding how ghrelin affects cortisol and adrenocorticotropic hormone (ACTH) secretion along with how cortisol and ACTH levels affect ghrelin are inconsistent as different psychological and physical stressors within in-vivo studies have produced a myriad of results as the underlying mechanisms are still not understood well.

== Role(s) in disease ==
=== Gastric bypass surgery ===
Gastric bypass surgery not only reduces gut capacity for food, but also lowers ghrelin levels compared to both lean people and those who lost weight through dieting. Studies have not clarified whether ghrelin levels return to normal in people who had gastric bypass surgery after weight loss has stabilized. Gastric bypass surgery involving vertical-sleeve gastrectomy reduces plasma ghrelin levels by about 60% in the long term.

=== Anorexia and obesity ===
Ghrelin levels in the plasma of obese individuals are lower than those in leaner individuals, suggesting that ghrelin does not contribute to obesity, except in the cases of Prader–Willi syndrome-induced obesity, where high ghrelin levels are correlated with increased food intake. Those with anorexia nervosa have high plasma levels of ghrelin compared to both the constitutionally thin and normal-weight controls. In healthy individuals, levels of circulating ghrelin increase during the time of day from midnight to dawn. However, a study comparing obese and healthy men found that this nocturnal increase in ghrelin was absent in the obese population, suggesting alterations of circadian patterns in obese men. Ghrelin levels are high in people with cancer-induced cachexia. There is insufficient evidence to conclude either for or against use of ghrelin in managing cachexia associated with cancer.

=== Effects on cardiovascular system ===
Ghrelin has been theorized to have protective effects on the cardiovascular system. Studies have shown that in mice models of myocardial infarction (MI) with knock-outs of ghrelin, subjects with no endogenous ghrelin production had a significantly increased mortality rate along with worse metrics in terms of cardiac sympathetic activity and systolic function when compared to wild-type subjects. with exogenous ghrelin being shown to improve heart function in rodent models of chronic heart failure and improved ventricular remodeling in post-MI rats.

== See also ==
- Hypothalamic–pituitary–somatic axis
- List of growth hormone secretagogues
- Leptin
- Raptin
