= List of doping cases in sport (T) =

This is a sub-list from List of doping cases in sport representing a full list of surnames starting with T.

Name	Country	Event	Banned substance(s)	Reference(s)
Tang Ninsha	China	Swimming	Metandienone	
Ekaterina Tankeeva	Russia	Water polo		
Ibrahim Tanko	Ghana	Football (soccer)	cannabis	
Anissa Tann	Australia	Football (soccer)	Nandrolone	
Alvaro Tardaguila	Uruguay	Cycling	r-EPO	
Roy Tarpley	United States	Basketball	Cocaine	
Antonio Tarver	United States	Boxing	Drostanolone	
Fernando Tatís Jr.	Dominican Republic	Baseball	Clostebol	
Martin Tauber	Austria	Cross-country skiing	Violation of blood doping rules	
Dom Taylor	England	Darts	cocaine, cannabis	
Maurice Taylor	United States	Basketball	Marijuana	
Irina Tchachina	Russia	Rhythmic gymnastics	Furosemide	
Miguel Tejada	Dominican Republic	Baseball	Amphetamines	
Rosa Tenerio	Ecuador	Weightlifting		
Michail Tetteris	Greece	Water polo	Budesonide	
Than Kyi Kyi	Myanmar	Weightlifting	Diuretic	
Upul Tharanga	Sri Lanka	Cricket	Prednisone, Prednisolone	
José Théodore	Canada	Ice hockey	Finasteride	
Pan Yar Thet	Myanmar	Weightlifting		
Gert-Jan Theunisse	Netherlands	Cycling	Admitted use of celestone	
Brad Thomas	Australia	Baseball		
Josh Thomas	Australia	Australian rules football	Clenbuterol	
Tammy Thomas	United States	Cycling	Testosterone	
Tristan Thompson	Canada	Basketball	Ibutamoren, LGD-4033	
Leks Tomasz	Poland	Weightlifting		
Do Thi Ngan Thuong	Vietnam	Gymnastics	Furosemide	
Tian Nannan	China	Swimming	Drostanolone	
Egor Titov	Russia	Football (soccer)	Bromantan	
Richard Tkac	Slovakia	Weightlifting	Boldenone, Androsterone	
Paola Todaro	Italy	Water polo	Cocaine	
Olibia Toka	Greece	Weightlifting	Methyltrienolone, Buprenorphine	
Rajiv Tomar	India	Wrestling	Methylhexaneamine	
James Toney	United States	Boxing	Nandrolone	
Jasdeep Toor	Canada	Football (soccer)	Methylhexaneamine	
Bela Torok	Hungary	Water polo	Hydrochlorothiazide	
Anthony Torres	United States	Mixed martial arts	Boldenone	
Kolo Touré	Ivory Coast	Football (soccer)		
Mark Tout	United Kingdom	Bobsleigh	Stanozolol	
Pawel Trenda	Poland	Swimming	Cannabis	
Anastasios Triantafyllou	Greece	Weightlifting	Stanozolol, Methyltrienolone	
Viktor Troicki	Serbia	Tennis	Refusal to submit to doping test	
Alan Tsagaev	Bulgaria	Weightlifting	Steroids	
Thomas Tsakirakis	Greece	Water polo	Stanozolol	
Felix Tsarikaev	Russia	Wrestling	Hydroxystanozolol	
Damian Tsekenis	Australia	Football (soccer)	Ibutamoren, Enobosarm, RAD140, Ligandrol	
Phil Tufnell	United Kingdom	Cricket	Missed drug test	
Shemshat Tuliayeva	Belarus	Weightlifting	Clenbuterol	
Ben Tune	Australia	Rugby		
Hedo Türkoğlu	Turkey	Basketball	Methenolone	
Billy Turley	England	Football (soccer)	Nandrolone (2002) cocaine (2004)	
Derrick Turnbow	United States	Baseball	Steroids	
Federico Turrini	Italy	Swimming	19-norandrosterone	
Ano Turtiainen	Finland	Powerlifting	Androgenic drugs	
Alexandra Tziouti	Greece	Cycling	Nandrolone	
