= List of doping cases in sport (L) =

This is a sub-list from List of doping cases in sport representing a full list of surnames starting with L.

| Name | Country | Event | Banned substance(s) | Reference(s) |
|---|---|---|---|---|
| Raimonds Lācis | Latvia | Weightlifting | Furosemide | (in Latvian) |
| Marina Lacroix | France | Swimming | Cannabis | |
| Lee Lacy | United States | Baseball | Cocaine | |
| Francisca Laia | Portugal | Canoeing | Dehydrochlormethyltestosterone | |
| Juha Lallukka | Finland | Cross-country skiing | Growth hormone | |
| Óscar Lagos | Honduras | Football (soccer) | Cocaine, marihuana | |
| Bernard Lama | France | Football (soccer) | Cannabis | |
| Eric Lamaze | Canada | Equestrian | Cocaine | |
| Florin Lambagiu | Romania | Kickboxing | Winstrol,Turinabol,clostebol,meldonium | |
| Abreu Lamec | Venezuela | Weightlifting | Stanozolol | |
| Floyd Landis | United States | Cycling | Testosterone | |
| Jeremy Landy | France | Water polo | Cannabis | |
| Saskia Lang | Germany | Handball | higenamine | |
| Jose Langberg | Peru | Swimming | Cannabis | |
| Dmitry Lapikov | Russia | Weightlifting | Methylhexaneamine | |
| Konstantina Lapou | Greece | Weightlifting | | |
| Arnaud Laroche | France | Swimming | Testosterone | |
| Simon Larose | Canada | Tennis | Cocaine | |
| Mehrullah Lassi | Pakistan | Boxing | Cannabis | |
| Rick Leach | United States | Baseball | | |
| Pei-Lin Lee | Chinese Taipei | Weightlifting | Furosemide | |
| Lassouani Leila | France | Weightlifting | Norandrosterone 4,9 ng/ml | |
| Chun Leung Lau | Hong Kong | Swimming | Methandienone | |
| Matt Lawton | United States | Baseball | Boldenone | |
| Stan Lazaridis | Australia | Football (soccer) | Finasteride | |
| Larisa Lazutina | Russia | Cross-country skiing | NESP | |
| Fabien Le Bec | France | Water polo | Cannabis | |
| Chris Leben | United States | Mixed martial arts | Stanozolol | |
| Luc Leblanc | France | Cycling | Erythropoietin (EPO) (self admitted) | |
| Yann Lejuste | France | Water polo | cannabis | |
| Rasa Leleivytė | Lithuania | Cycling | EPO | |
| Benoit Lemeunier | France | Swimming | Cannabis | |
| Kayle Leogrande | United States | Cycling | Erythropoietin (non-analytical positive) | |
| Dimitru Leonard | Romania | Weightlifting | Norandrosterone | |
| Jeffrey Leonard | United States | Baseball | Cocaine | |
| Vladimir Leontiev | Russia | Swimming | Cannabis | |
| Kimo Leopoldo | United States | Mixed martial arts | Stanozolol | |
| Varvara Lepchenko | United States | Tennis | Meldonium (Provisionally suspended); Adrafinil, and metabolite modafinil (Suspended for four years) | |
| Stephen Letchford | England | Ten-pin bowling | Benzoylecgonine | |
| Nick Leventis | England | Auto racing | Anabolic steroids | |
| Nikita Leviakov | Russia | Swimming | Stanozolol, Dehydrochlormethyltestosterone | |
| Clayton Lewis | New Zealand | Football (soccer) | Salbutamol | |
| Kristen Lewis | United States | Swimming | Pseudoephedrine | |
| Rashard Lewis | United States | Basketball | Steroids (ten-game suspension) | |
| Manukyan Liana | Armenia | Weightlifting | Metandienone | |
| Yohan Lidon | France | Kickboxing, Muay Thai | Heptaminol | |
| Semen Linder | Kazakhstan | Weightlifting | Stanozolol | |
| Li Ning | China | Swimming | | |
| Li Zhesi | China | Swimming | EPO | |
| Valiantsina Liakhavets | Belarus | Weightlifting | | |
| Rafael Liechti | Switzerland | Water polo | Cannabis | |
| Hans-Gunnar Liljenwall | Sweden | Modern pentathlon | Alcohol | |
| Mads Lind | Denmark | Handball | Anabolic steroids | |
| Lourdes Domínguez Lino | Spain | Tennis | Cocaine | |
| Marina Lisogor | Ukraine | Cross-country skiing | Trimetazidine | |
| Yuliya Litvina | Kazakhstan | Swimming | Methylhexaneamine | |
| Alexander Litvintchev | Russia | Rowing | | |
| Liu Bingyao | China | Swimming | Clenbuterol | |
| Jing Liu | China | Swimming | Prednisone | |
| Liu Xingchen | China | Swimming | Clenbuterol | |
| Jake Livermore | England | Football (soccer) | Cocaine | |
| Claudio Liverziani | Italy | Baseball | Amphetamines | |
| Jose Llanos Quiceno | Colombia | Water polo | THC, Cannabis | |
| Ryan Llewellyn | United Kingdom | Boxing | Methylhexaneamine | |
| Lewis Lloyd | United States | Basketball | Cocaine | |
| Paul Lo Duca | United States | Baseball | Steroids | (Admission of guilt) |
| Aleh Loban | Belarus | Weightlifting | Metandienone | |
| Romain Locher | France | Water polo | cannabis | |
| Joshua Loges | Germany | Swimming | Clenbuterol | |
| Héctor Lombard | Australia | Mixed martial arts (MMA) | Desoxymethyltestosterone | |
| Boris Loncaric | Croatia | Swimming | Methylhexaneamine | |
| Simos Loukas | Greece | Water polo | Methylphenidate | |
| Paulo Da Silva Loureiro | Portugal | Volleyball | Cannabinoids | |
| Sebastien Louveau | France | Swimming | Cannabis | |
| Didi Louzada | United States | Basketball | Drostanolone, testosterone | |
| Natalya Lovtsova | Russia | Swimming | | |
| Jake Lowther | United Kingdom | Motorcycling | | |
| Brenda Lozaique | Seychelles | Weightlifting | Metandienone | |
| Miryan Lozi | Albania | Weightlifting | | |
| Lü Bin | China | Swimming | | |
| Lu Leyujia | China | Swimming | Drostanolone | |
| Lu Meng | China | Wrestling | Diuretic | |
| Frank Luck | Germany | Biathlon | Turinabol (self-admitted) | |
| Lebron Luis | Puerto Rico | Weightlifting | Methylhexaneamine | |
| Vladislav Lukanin | Russia | Weightlifting | Noraxondrolone, Epioxandrolone | |
| Zach Lund | United States | Skeleton | Finasteride | |
| Luo Meng | China | Wrestling | Diuretic | |
| Zsolt Lutter | Hungary | Swimming | Refusal to submit to doping test | |
| Evgeny Luzyanin | Russia | Rowing | | |
| Kerry Lynch | United States | Nordic combined | Blood doping | |
| Chris Lynn | Australia | Cricket | Cocaine | |

|}
