= List of doping cases in sport (S) =

This is a sub-list from List of doping cases in sport representing a full list of surnames starting with S.

Name	Country	Event	Banned substance(s)	Reference(s)
Ahmed Saad	Australia	Australian rules football		
Milla Saari (née Jauho)	Finland	Cross-country skiing	HES	
Evi Sachenbacher-Stehle	Germany	Biathlon	Methylhexanamine	
Sharifi Sadeh	Iran	Weightlifting	Metandienone	
Donnie Sadler	United States	Baseball	"drug of abuse"	
Şule Şahbaz	Turkey	Weightlifting		
Mamadou Sakho	France	Football (soccer)	Fat-burning substance	
Nicholas Santos	Brazil	Swimming	Furosemide	
Asaad Said	Qatar	Weightlifting		
Saiedah Said	Singapore	Silat	Nor-Sibutramine, OH-Nor Sibutramine	
Wendell Sailor	Australia	Rugby union	Cocaine	
Juan Salas	Dominican Republic	Baseball		
Richard Salazar	Venezuela	Baseball		
Daniel Sam	United Kingdom	Kickboxing		
Zabit Samedov	Azerbaijan	Kickboxing	Anabolic steroid	
Leonidas Sampanis	Greece	Weightlifting	Testosterone	
Maarten Sampermans	Belgium	Volleyball	Cannabinoids	
Olga Samulenkova	Russia	Rowing	Testosterone	
Chris Salem	Lebanon	Rugby league	Methylhexaneamine	
Yann San Biagio	France	Water polo	Cannabis	
Alex Sánchez	Cuba	Baseball	Steroids	
Francisco Pérez Sanchez	Spain	Cycling	Erythropoietin (EPO)	
Joel Sánchez	Peru	Football (soccer)	Methylhexaneamine	
Larry Sanders	United States	Basketball	Marijuana	
Pradeep Sangwan	India	Cricket	Steroid	
Mauro Santambrogio	Italy	Cycling		
Ervin Santana	Dominican Republic	Baseball	Stanozolol	
Induino Santoni	Italy	Lifesaving	Cocaine	
Virpi Sarasvuo (née Kuitunen)	Finland	Cross-country skiing	HES	
Mitchell Sargent	Australia	Rugby league	Cocaine	
Viseslav Saric	Croatia	Swimming	Cannabis	
Santis Sarkanis	Latvia	Cycling	Ephedrine	(in Latvian)
Hasan Şaş	Turkey	Football (soccer)	Fenilpropanolamin	
Todd Sauerbrun	United States	American football	Ephedra	
Dmitry Sayustov	Russia	Ice hockey		
Adam Sbieh	United States	Cycling	Erythropoietin (EPO)	
Orlando Scandrick	United States	American football	Amphetamines (MDMA)	
Michele Scarponi	Italy	Cycling	Operación Puerto doping case	
Viktors Ščerbatihs	Latvia	Weightlifting	Anabolic steroids	(in Latvian)
Uliana Schcherbo	Ukraine	Weightlifting	Stanozolol	
Fränk Schleck	Luxembourg	Cycling	Xipamide	
Mike Schmidt	United States	Baseball	Amphetamines (self-admitted)	
Nate Schmidt	United States	Hockey		
Roland Schmidt	East Germany	Weightlifting	Turinabol (self-admitted)	
Petra Schneider	East Germany	Swimming	Anabolic steroids (self-admitted)	
Carl Schreuder	South Africa	Swimming	Ephedrine	
Katja Schumacher	Germany	Triathlon	Testosterone	
Stefan Schumacher	Germany	Cycling	CERA	
Alex Schwazer	Italy	Athletics	Epo	
Mehdi Sebou	Morocco	Water polo	Nandrolone	
Violeta Sechka	Belarus	Weightlifting	Drostanolone	
Sead Seferović	Bosnia and Herzegovina	Football (soccer)	Ephedrine	
David Segui	United States	Baseball	Anabolic steroids, growth hormone	
Mudarra Segura	Costa Rica	Cycling	GW501516	
Emanuele Sella	Italy	Cycling	Erythropoietin (EPO)	
Yury Selyutin	Russia	Weightlifting	Metandienone	
Sun Yang	China	Swimming	Not to declare the use of medical drugs	
Dan Serafini	United States	Baseball	Performance-enhancing drug	
Alexander Serebryakov	Russia	Cycling		
Armas Sergio	Argentina	Weightlifting	Clenbuterol	
Diogo dos Santos Serra	Portugal	Water polo	Cocaine	
Jeremy Serreau	France	Water polo	Testosterone	
Óscar Sevilla	Spain	Cycling		
Roberto Sgambelluri	Italy	Cycling	NESP	
Frank Shackman	Germany	Weightlifting	Metandienone	
Yasir Shah	Pakistan	Cricket	Chlortalidone	
Salem Hussain Shaheen	Saudi Arabia	Swimming	Cannabis	
Yacoub Shahenda	Jordan	Weightlifting	Stanozolol	
Khurram Shahzad	Pakistan	Weightlifting	Methandienone	
Mohammad Shahzad	Afghanistan	Cricket	Clenbuterol	
Ken Shamrock	United States	Mixed Martial Arts	Stanozolol, 19-Norandrosterone and 19-Noretiocholanolone	
Tariq Ali Sharahli	Saudi Arabia	Volleyball	Cannabinoids	
Maria Sharapova	Russia	Tennis	Meldonium	
Surya Prasad Sharma	India	Swimming	Stanozolol	
Keri-Leigh Shaw	South Africa	Swimming	Clenbuterol, Ephedrine	
Prithvi Shaw	India	Cricket	Terbutaline	
Maxim Shcherbakov	Russia	Swimming		
Shang Shichun	China	Weightlifting		
Frankie Sheahan	Ireland	Rugby	Salbutomol	
Gary Sheffield	United States	Baseball	Steroids (no rules set for punishment)	
Ahmed Shehzad	Pakistan	Cricket		
Tuliayeva Shemshat	Belarus	Weightlifting	Clenbuterol	
Sean Sherk	United States	Mixed martial arts	Nandrolone (tainted supplement)	
Andrey Shevtsov	Canada	Swimming	Cannabinoids	
Georgi Shikov	Bulgaria	Weightlifting	Clenbuterol, Hydroxystanozolol	
Takahiro Shimonaka	Japan	Wrestling	Tamoxifen	
Sergei Shiriaev	Russia	Cross-country skiing	Erythropoietin (EPO)	
Denis Shiryakov	Russia	Weightlifting		
Katsiryna Shkuraava	Belarus	Weightlifting	Metandienone	
Oleg Shteinikov	Kazakhstan	Swimming	Nandrolone	
Abdurahman Shtwei	Libya	Weightlifting	Testosterone, Epitestosterone	
Chase Shugart	United States	Baseball	"drug of abuse"	
Azizojan Shukurov	Tajikistan	Weightlifting	Metandienone	
Irina Sibetova	Russia	Weightlifting	Metandienone	
Kashif Siddiq	Pakistan	Cricket	Nandralone, Stanazolol	
Jörg Harald Sievers	East Germany	Swimming	Turinabol	
Steve Siler	United States	Swimming	Ephedrine	
Kristina Silkina	Russia	Weightlifting		
Antônio Silva	Brazil	Mixed Martial Arts	Boldenone	
Glauber Araujo Silva	Brazil	Swimming	Testosterone	
Filippo Simeoni	Italy	Cycling	Erythropoietin (EPO), growth hormone	
Adrian Simion	Romania	Handball	Ephedrine	
Helle Simonsen	Denmark	Curling	Unspecified	
Win Shwe Sin	Myanmar	Weightlifting		
Harpreet Singh	India	Weightlifting	Nandroline	
Rajesh Kumar Singh	India	Weightlifting	Metandienone	
Tajinder Singh	India	Weightlifting		
Jon Singleton	United States	Baseball	Marijuana	
Patrik Sinkewitz	Germany	Cycling	Testosterone	
Jannik Sinner	Italy	Tennis	Clostebol	
Oleksandr Sitalo	Ukraine	Wrestling	THC	
Faina Sivanbayeva	Kazakhstan	Weightlifting	Stanozolol	
Marcel Six	United Kingdom	Cycling	Refusal to submit to doping test	
Michael Skelde	Denmark	Cycling	Testosterone	
Jesper Skibby	Denmark	Cycling	(self-admitted)	(in Danish)
Eric Skoglund	United States	Baseball	Ostarine, ligandrol	
Antonina Skorobogatchenko	Russia	Handball	meldonium	
Tremayne Smartt	Guyana	Cricket	Furosemide	
Svetlana Anatolievna Smirnova	Russia	Handball	Nandrolon	
Adam Smith	United States	Mixed martial arts	cocaine, cannabis	
Joel Smith	Australia	Australian rules football	Cocaine	
Kenneth Smith	South Africa	Swimming	Cannabinoids, MDMA	
Lonnie Smith	United States	Baseball	Cocaine	
Michelle Smith (Michelle de Bruin)	Ireland	Swimming	Tampering with test	
Paul Smith	England	Cricket	Cocaine, confessed after quitting the sport.	
Richard Smith	Australia	Cycling	Blood Doping	
Ebi Smolarek	Poland	Football (soccer)	Cannabis	
Matt Socholotiuk	Canada	Canadian football	Human growth hormone	
Edgars Soika	Latvia	Curling	Spironolactone	(in Latvian)
Sergei Sokolov	Azerbaijan	Football (soccer)	Betamethasone	
Andrey Solomennikov	Russia	Cycling		
Nasser El Sonbaty	Germany	Bodybuilding	Diuretics	
Christiane Knacke-Sommer	East Germany	Swimming	Anabolic steroids. (Self-admitted)	
Chael Sonnen	United States	Mixed Martial Arts	testosterone/epitestosterone, ratio, anastrozole, clomiphene, Human Growth Hormone, Erythropoeitan (EPO), Human Chorionic Gonadotropin,	
Lary Sorensen	United States	Baseball	Cocaine	
Rolf Sørensen	Denmark	Cycling	EPO, cortisone	
Yoel Sotolongo	Cuba	Weightlifting	Metandienone	
Maria Sotskova	Russia	Figure skating	Furosemide	
Maurizio Spaziano	Italy	Water polo	Cannabis	
Duncan Spencer	England	Cricket	Nandrolone	
Brandon Spikes	United States	American football		
Nikos Spyropoulos	Greece	Football (soccer)	Testosterone	(in Greek)
Giorgia Squizzato	Italy	Swimming	Clostebol	
Sukanya Srisurat	Thailand	Weightlifting	Methandienone	
Zinaida Stahurskaya	Belarus	Cycling	stanozolol, testosterone	
Jaap Stam	Netherlands	Football (soccer)	Nandrolone	
Roger Stanislaus	England	Football (soccer)	Cocaine	
Cody Stanley	United States	Baseball	Methylhexaneamine, tamoxifen (2012); dehydrochlormethyltestosterone (2015)	
James Stanton	Australia	Water polo	Clenbuterol	
Matt Stevens	England	Rugby Union	Cocaine	
Anthony Steward	South Africa	Water polo	Benzoylecgonine	
David Stits	Belgium	Water polo	Cannabis	
Ivan Stoitsov	Bulgaria	Weightlifting	Steroids	
Nick Stone	Australia	Australian rules football	Amphetamine, methamphetamine	
Marko Strahija	Croatia	Swimming	hCG	
Dee Strange-Gordon	United States	Baseball	Exogenous testosterone, clostebol	
Astrid Strauss	East Germany	Swimming	Testosterone	
Darryl Strawberry	United States	Baseball	Cocaine	
Dimitriy Striga	Kazakhstan	Weightlifting	Stanozolol	
Marcus Stroman	United States	Baseball	Methylhexaneamine	
Jamal Strong	United States	Baseball		
Marcus Stroud	United States	American football	Anabolic steroids	
Barbora Strýcová	Czech Republic	Tennis	Sibutramine	
Jamie Stuart	England	Football (soccer)	Cocaine, Cannabis	
Dana Stubblefield	United States	American football	THG	
Daniel Stumpf	United States	Baseball	Dehydrochlormethyltestosterone	
Anna Stylianou	Cyprus	Swimming	Nandrolone	
Shabaz Sule	Turkey	Weightlifting		
Zulfugar Suleymanov	Azerbaijan	Weightlifting	T/E 9,6 (2010); Dehydromethyltestosterone (2013)	
Ilirian Suli	Albania	Weightlifting	Methandienone	
Moldodosov Sultan	Kyrgyzstan	Weightlifting	Metandienone	
Salem Sultan	United Arab Emirates	Weightlifting	Stanozolol, Hydroxystanozolol	
Leonardo Sumida	Brazil	Swimming	Cannabis	
Sun Yan	China	Weightlifting		
S Sunaina	India	Weightlifting	Nandrolone	
Martin Johnsrud Sundby	Norway	Cross-country skiing	Salbutamol	
Joe Surgenor	Canada	Canadian football		
Evgeni Sviridov	Uzbekistan	Figure skating		
Eranga Swarnathilake	Sri Lanka	Rugby union	Methylhexanamine	
Iga Świątek	Poland	Tennis	Trimetazidine	
Tim Sylvia	United States	Mixed martial arts	Nandrolone	
Nataliya Syrota	Ukraine	Weightlifting	Octopamine	
Botond Szalma	Hungary/Netherlands	Water polo	Cannabis	
Nikolett Szepesi	Hungary	Swimming	Missed test	
Krzysztof Szramiak	Poland	Weightlifting	Methandienone	
