= List of doping cases in sport (B) =

This is a sub-list from List of doping cases in sport representing a full list of surnames starting with B.

== List ==
Name	Country	Event	Banned substance(s)	Reference(s)
Christopher Bach	France	Swimming	Prednisone	
Jonathan Bachini	Italy	Football (soccer)	Cocaine	
Nicklas Bäckström	Sweden	Ice hockey	Pseudoephedrine	
Cezar Badita	Romania	Swimming	Nandrolone	(in German)
Ron Baensch	Australia	Cycling	Ephedrine	
Nathan Baggaley	Australia	Kayaking	Stanozolol, Methandienone	
Sarah Baham	United States	Swimming	Refusal to submit to doping test	
Tzuche Bakam	Cameroon	Weightlifting	Boldenone, androsterone	
Erwin Bakker	Netherlands	Cycling	Erythropoietin (EPO)	
Yesenia Baldera Peguero	Dominican Republic	Weightlifting	Stanozolol, Hydroxystanozolol	
Singh Baljit	India	Weightlifting		
Daniela Balzan Leal	Venezuela	Weightlifting	Boldenone	
Michael Banbula	United Kingdom	Boxing	Testosterone	
Roberto Barbaro	Italy	Water polo	Norandrosterone	
Henrique Barbosa	Brazil	Swimming	Furosemide	
Josh Barnett	United States	Mixed martial arts	Boldenone	
Phil Baroni	United States	Mixed martial arts	Boldenone, stanozolol metabolites	
Vargas Barrantes	Costa Rica	Cycling	GW501516	
Tres Barrera	United States	Baseball	Dehydrochlormethyltestosterone	
Ryan Barrett	United Kingdom	Boxing	Methylhexaneamine	
Yarelys Barrios	Cuba	Athletics	acetazolamide	
Kévin Barrois	France	Swimming	Cannabis, Prednisone, Prednisolone	
Doug Barron	United States	Golf	Performance Enhancing Drugs	
Karapet Barseghyan	Armenia	Weightlifting	Stanozolol	
Julyana Bassi Kury	Brazil	Swimming	Stanozolol	
Ivan Basso	Italy	Cycling	Operación Puerto doping case	
Antonio Bastardo	Dominican Republic	Baseball	Performance-enhancing drugs (2013, see Biogenesis scandal), stanozolol (2018)	
Marta Bastianelli	Italy	Cycling	Fenfluramine	
Xavier Batista	Dominican Republic	Baseball		
Vicky Batta	India	Weightlifting	Metandienone	
Grégory Baugé	France	Cycling	Drug-testing violations	
Alain Baxter	United Kingdom	Alpine skiing	Methamphetamine (inactive levorotary isomer – levmethamphetamine)	
Fatih Baydar	Turkey	Weightlifting	Hydroxystanozolol	
Karol Beck	Slovakia	Tennis	Clenbuterol	
Diane Becker	Brazil	Swimming	Stanozolol	
Tim Beckham	United States	Baseball	Marijuana (2012), stanozolol (2019)	
Rutker Beke	Belgium	Triathlon	EPO	
Vitor Belfort	Brazil	Mixed martial arts	4-hydroxytestosterone	
Joseph Belinga	Cameroon	Weightlifting	N-bisdesmethyl sibutramine	
C.G. Carmen Bellorin	Venezuela	Weightlifting	Metandienone	
Manuel Beltrán	Spain	Cycling	Erythropoietin (EPO)	
Barbara Benke	Brazil	Swimming	Isometheptene	
Jamal Ben Saddik	Morocco	Kickboxing		
Saido Berahino	Burundi	Football (soccer)	MDMA	
Bryan Berard	United States	Ice hockey	19-norandrosterone	
Virginia Berasategui	Spain	Triathlon	Erythropoietin (EPO)	
Maxime Beretta	France	Diving	Cannabis	
Elena Berezhnaya	Russia	Figure skating	Pseudoephedrine	
Adam Bergman	United States	Cycling	Erythropoietin (EPO)	
Lorenzo Bernucci	Italy	Cycling	Sibutramine	
Dale Berra	United States	Baseball	Cocaine	
Carlo Bertoncelli	Italy	Swimming	Finasteride	
Eugeni Berzin	Russia	Cycling	Blood doping	
Rafael Betancourt	Venezuela	Baseball	Anabolic steroids	
Wilson Betemit	Dominican Republic	Baseball	Amphetamine	
Christina Bethani	Greece	Swimming	Acetazolamide	
PJ Bevis	Australia	Baseball		
Muhammad Bhatti	Pakistan	Weightlifting	Metandienone	
Ildara Bilyaletdinov	Russia	Wrestling		
Yusoff Binti	Morocco	Weightlifting	Drostnolone	
Rod Bitz	Canada	Wheelchair rugby	Methylhexaneamine	
Hafþór Júlíus Björnsson	Iceland	Strongman	Steroids (self-admitted)	
Pierre Blanchard	France	Water polo	Prednisone, Prednisolone	
Yohan Blanchet	France	Water polo	Cannabis	
Alberto Blanco	Cuba	Weightlifting	Anabolic steroids	
Manuele Blasi	Italy	Football (soccer)	Nandrolone	
Aikaterini Bliamou	Greece	Swimming	Nandrolone	
Jamie Bloem	Australia	Rugby league, rugby union	Nandrolone	
Nickolay Bocharov	Russia	Swimming	Nandrolone	
Mickael Bodegas	France	Water polo	Cannabis	
Alexander Bodyakin	Russia	Swimming	Furosemide	
Plamen Boev	Bulgaria	Weightlifting	Norandrosterone	
Galabin Boevski	Bulgaria	Weightlifting	Tampering with test	
Alex Bogomolov Jr.	United States	Tennis	Salbutamol	
Peter Bol	Australia	Athletics	Erythropoietin (EPO) (later exonerated)	
Udo Bölts	Germany	Cycling	Erythropoietin (EPO) (self-admitted)	
Barry Bonds	United States	Baseball	Amphetamines (first offender; not suspended per Major League Baseball collective bargaining agreement)	
Jorge Bonifacio	Dominican Republic	Baseball	Boldenone	
Stephan Bonnar	United States	Mixed martial arts	Boldenone	
Michael Boogerd	Netherlands	Cycling	Blood doping, cortisone, EPO,	
Tom Boonen	Belgium	Cycling	Cocaine	
Liliana Borbon	Mexico	Weightlifting		
Marco Borriello	Italy	Football (soccer)	Prednisolone	
Mark Bosnich	Australia	Football (soccer)	Cocaine	
David Boston	United States	American football	Gamma-Hydroxybutyric acid	
Ian Botham	United Kingdom	Cricket	Cannabis	
Igor Bour	Moldova	Weightlifting	Metandienone	
Djamel Bouras	France	Judo	Nandrolone	
Frederick Bousquet	France	Swimming	Heptaminol	
Lee Bowyer	England	Football (soccer)	Cannabis	
Plezhanov Boyan	Belarus	Weightlifting	Metandienone	
Dmitry Boyko	Russia	Snowboarding		
Tosan Boyo	Nigeria	Swimming	Dexamethasone	
Doug Bracewell	New Zealand	Cricket	Cocaine	
Andrew James Brack	Greece	Baseball	Stanozolol	
Marvin Bracy	United States	Athletics	Testosterone	
Shqiponje Brahja	Albania	Weightlifting	T/E 65	
Ryan Braun	United States	Baseball	Human growth hormone. See also Biogenesis baseball scandal.	
Anyelo Brea	Dominican Republic	Wrestling	Furosemide	
Andrew Bree	Ireland	Swimming	Levmethamphetamine	
Mladen Brestovac	Croatia	Kickboxing	Meldonium	
Matt Bricker	United States	Swimming	Ephedrine	
Terry Bridge	United Kingdom	Rugby league	Steroids	
David Britz	South Africa	Rugby union	Boldenone	
Laurent Brochard	France	Cycling	Erythropoietin (EPO)	
Daniel Broussard	Canada	Ice hockey	Methylhexaneamine	
Ian Brown	United Kingdom	Rugby	Testosterone	
Lucas Browne	Australia	Boxing	Clenbuterol, Ostarine	
Justin Brownlee	Philippines	Basketball	11-Nor-9-carboxy-THC (prescription drug)	
Emily Brunneman	United States	Swimming	Hydrochlorothiazide, Triamterene	
Rebekkah Brunson	United States	Basketball	Salmeterol (only given public warning)	
Nicola Brustia	Italy	Water polo	Cannabis	
Dave Bruylandts	Belgium	Cycling	Erythropoietin (EPO)	(in Dutch)
Christian Bucchi	Italy	Football (soccer)	Nandrolone	
Katharina Bullin	East Germany	Volleyball		
Jonathan Bullough	United Kingdom	Weightlifting	Methylhexaneamine	
Renata Burgos	Brazil	Swimming	Stanozolol	
Rachael Burke	United States	Swimming	Boldione	
Ian Burnham	United Kingdom	Water polo	Cocaine	
Jack Burnham	England	Cricket	Cocaine	
Andrew Burns	Australia	Swimming	Ecstasy	
Alexey Bushin	Russia	Swimming	Sustanol	
Asim Butt	Scotland	Cricket	Ecstasy	
Marlon Byrd	United States	Baseball	Tamoxifen (2012), ipamorelin (2016)	
David Bystroň	Czech Republic	Football (soccer)	Methamphetamine	
Agnieska Bystrzycka	Poland	Swimming	Nikethamide	
