= List of doping cases in sport (A) =

This is a sub-list from List of doping cases in sport representing a full list of surnames starting with A.

== List ==
Name	Country	Sport	Year of violation	Anti-doping rule violation / Banned substance(s)	Sanction	Reference(s)
Fritz Aanes	Norway	Greco-Roman wrestling		Norandrosterone, Noretiocholanolone		
Tom Aage Aarnes	Norway	Ski jumping		Amphetamine		
Fernando Abad	Dominican Republic	Baseball	2018	Stanozolol	80 games	
Mariya Abakumova	Russia	Athletics	2008	Dehydrochlormethyltestosterone (Turinabol)		
Sara Abbazova	Azerbaijan	Powerlifting	2001	Nandrolone	Life	
Damin Abbiate	Argentina	Weightlifting		Nandrolone		
Salwan Abbood	Egypt	Weightlifting		Stanozolol		
Kalifa Abdalla	Libya	Weightlifting		Metandienone		
Walid Abdelaal	Egypt	Wrestling		Stanozolol		
Ibrahim Abdelbaki	Egypt	Wrestling		Methylhexaneamine		
Yamil Abdellatif	Morocco	Weightlifting		Cannabis		
Donia Abdelrahman	Egypt	Weightlifting		Hydroxystanozolol		
Djamolidine Abdoujaparov	Uzbekistan	Cycling	1997	Clenbuterol, bromantan	1 year (Extended from 6 months)	
Hashim Abdulkareem	Egypt	Weightlifting		Norandrosterone		
Muminjon Abdullaev	Uzbekistan	Wrestling		Nandrolone		
Inga Abitova	Russia	Athletics	2008	Dehydrochlormethyltestosterone (Turinabol)		
Alex Acco	Brazil	Beach volleyball		Norandrosterone, Noretiocholanolone		
Olimbek Achildiev	Uzbekistan	Weightlifting				
Johan Ackermann	South Africa	Rugby union		Nandrolone		
Ali Adams	United Kingdom	Boxing	2012	Stanozolol	2 years	
Phillip Adams	Australia	Shooting	2002	Hydrochlorothiazide	2 years	
Jim Adduci	United States	Baseball	2016	oxycodone	36 games, team fined	
Adham Khazeiq	Palestine	Weightlifting		Nandrolone, Norandrosterone		
Andre Agassi	United States	Tennis		Methamphetamine (self-admitted)		
Uche Agu	Nigeria	Weightlifting		Norandrosterone		
Abdulmunem Ahmed	Iraq	Weightlifting		Methyltestosterone		
All Ahmed	Yemen	Weightlifting		Metandienone, Norandrosterone, Anabolic steroids		
Naveed Ahmed Butt	Pakistan	Powerlifting	2008	Methandienone metabolites	2 years	
Willie Aikens	United States	Baseball		Cocaine (self-admitted)		
Mirambek Ainagulov	Kazakhstan	Wrestling		Furosemide		
Lizandro Ajcú	Guatemala	Cycling		Erythropoietin (EPO)		
Karhan Akay	Turkey	Swimming		Methandienone		
Ali Akbar	Pakistan	Weightlifting				
Alibek Akbayev	Russia	Wrestling				
Albina Akhatova	Russia	Biathlon	2003; 2009	Nikethamide; Erythropoietin (EPO)		
Igor Akhlyustin	Russia	Swimming				
Shoaib Akhtar	Pakistan	Cricket		Nandrolone		
Atrhouros Akritidis	Greece	Weightlifting		Methyltrienolone, Buprenorphine		
Mohammed Al-Aifuri	Iraq	Weightlifting		Metandienone		
Abdul Rehman Al Bader	Kuwait	Swimming		Methylhexaneamine		
Noor Alam	Pakistan	Cycling		Nandrolone		
Carlos Alberto de Jesus	Brazil	Football (soccer)		Hydrochlorothiazide, Tamoxifen		
Victor Alcántara	Dominican Republic	Baseball	2020	Stanozolol	80 games	
Rolf Aldag	Germany	Cycling		Erythropoietin (EPO) (self-admitted)	—	
Darrell Alderman	United States	Drag racing		Cocaine		
Faisal Aldossri	Saudi Arabia	Tennis				
Denis Alekseyev	Russia	Athletics	2008	Dehydrochlormethyltestosterone (Turinabol)		
Evgeny Aleshin	Russia	Swimming				
Jose Alexis Valida	Spain	Volleyball		Cocaine		
Eliézer Alfonzo	Venezuela	Baseball	2008		50 games	
Stephen Alfred	United States	Cycling (track)	1998; 2006; 2007	Norandrosterone; Testosterone (May), hCG (June); Refusal to submit to doping control	6 months 8 years Life ban	
Muhammad Al-Ghaferi	United Arab Emirates	Swimming		Methylhexaneamine		
Dilsher Ali	Pakistan	Cycling		Nandrolone		
Hram Ali	Iraq	Weightlifting		Metandienone		
Javed Ali	Pakistan	Bodybuilding		Nandrolone		
Khalid Ali	Pakistan	Bodybuilding				
Sadam Ali	United States	Boxing		Cathine		
Amir Aliakbari	Iran	Wrestling		Anabolic steroids		
Waleed Ali Alghmdi	Saudi Arabia	Water polo		Cannabis		
Saeid Alihosseini	Iran	Weightlifting		Metandienone		
Abdullah Ali Rami	Yemen	Weightlifting		Metandienone, Ephedrine		
Mohsen Alizadeh	Iran	Water polo		Norandrosterone and metabolites		
Yousri Yaseer Allaili	Saudi Arabia	Water polo		Methamphetamine		
David Allen	United Kingdom	Rugby League		Metabolite of cocaine		
A. J. Allmendinger	United States	Auto racing		Amphetamines		
Carlos Almanzar	Dominican Republic	Baseball		Steroids		
Alimohamad Almharous	Saudi Arabia	Weightlifting		Metandienone		
Bassam Almohammad Alshahin	Syria	Weightlifting		Boldenone, Androsterone		
Abraham Almonte	Dominican Republic	Baseball	2016	Boldenone	80 games	
Jasim Yusuf Al Nabhan	Bahamas	Beach volleyball		Methylhexaneamine		
Mohamed Al Saedi	Iraq	Wrestling		Sibutramine		
Saoud AlShehhi	United Arab Emirates	Weightlifting		Stanozolol, Hydroxystanozolol		
José Alvarado	Venezuela	Baseball	2025	Exogenous testosterone	80 games	
Yeray Álvarez	Spain	Football (soccer)	2025		10 months	
Thiago Alves	Brazil	Mixed Martial Arts		Spironolactone		
Lyle Alzado	United States	American football		Anabolic steroids (self-admitted)		
Nehal Ameur	Egypt	Swimming		Methandienone		
Japhet Amador	Mexico	Baseball	2018	Chlortalidone and furosemide	6 months	
Wafa Ammouri	Morocco	Weightlifting				
Uwe Ampler	Germany	Cycling	1999	Steroids		
Chris Andersen	United States	Basketball				
Kim Andersen	Denmark	Cycling	1985; 1986; 1987; 1992	Undisclosed (7 Sept), Norephedrine (14 Sept); Undisclosed (8 April), Undisclosed (16 April), Undisclosed (27 April); Testosterone; Amineptine	1 year (Life ban lifted)	
Peter Riis Andersen	Denmark	Mountain biking		Erythropoietin (EPO)		
Darryl Anderson	United Kingdom	Motorcycle racing				
Ijah Anderson	England	Football (soccer)		Cocaine		
Silva Andrea	Brazil	Weightlifting		Norandrosterone		
Ekaterina Andreeva	Russia	Swimming				
Frankie Andreu	United States	Cycling		Erythropoietin (EPO) (self-admitted)		
Joaquín Andújar	Dominican Republic	Baseball		Cocaine		
Jacques Anquetil	France	Cycling		Self-admitted		
Henry Antchouet	Gabon	Football (soccer)		Cocaine		
Kristina Antoniychuk	Ukraine	Tennis		Furosemide		
Toppo Anupdeo	India	Weightlifting		Methylhexamine		
Abdallah Anwar	United States	Boccia		Hydrochlorothiazide		
Atif Anwar Ali	Pakistan	Bodybuilding				
Adam Anzorov	Russia	Wrestling				
Bijiya Arabam	India	Weightlifting		Metandienone		
Anos Armak	Iran	Weightlifting		Metandienone		
Andrei Aramnau	Belarus	Weightlifting		Synthetic cannabinoid		
Ibrahim Arat	Turkey	Weightlifting		Hydroxystanozolol		
Lorena Araujo	Brazil	Swimming		Stanozolol		
Fouodfi Arcangeline	Cameroon	Weightlifting		N-bisdesmethyl sibutramine		
Alexandros Aresti	Cyprus	Swimming		Stanozolol		
Chris Armstrong	England	Football (soccer)		Cannabis		
Lance Armstrong	United States	Cycling		Erythropoietin (EPO), Human Growth Hormone, Testosterone, Cortisone, Blood transfusions (self-admitted)	Life ban	
Marco Antonio Arriagada Quinchel	Chile	Cycling	2011	Stanozolol	4 years	
Michael Arroyo	Ecuador	Football (soccer)		cannabis		
Silvia Artola	Nicaragua	Weightlifting		Methylhexaneamine		
Kasem Asaad	Syria	Weightlifting		Methandriol, Methyltestosterone		
Man Asaad	Syria	Weightlifting		Metandienone		
Yamba Asha	Angola	Football (soccer)				
Alec Asher	United States	Baseball	2016	Dehydrochlormethyltestosterone	80 games	
Mohammed Asif	Pakistan	Cricket		Nandrolone		
Hasan Aslam	Pakistan	Weightlifting				
Nuno Assis	Portugal	Football (soccer)		Nandrolone		
Igor Astarloa	Spain	Cycling		Biological passport violation	2 years	
Mikel Astarloza	Spain	Cycling	2009	Erythropoietin (EPO)	2 years	
Ksenia Atamanskaya	Kazakhstan	Swimming		Fenoterol		
Anna Athanasiadou	Greece	Weightlifting		Methyltrienolone, Buprenorphine		
Mikhail Audzeyev	Belarus	Weightlifting		Boldenone, Androsterone		
Floren Augier	France	Swimming		Prednisone, Prednisolone		
Arthur Auray	France	Water polo		Cocaine		
Michele Aureli	Italy	Water polo		Betamethasone		
Niklas Axelsson	Sweden	Cycling	2001; 2009	EPO; EPO, testosterone	2 years and 8 months (Reduced from 4 years); Life ban	
Murat Aygün	Netherlands	Kickboxing		Metandienone		
Deandre Ayton	United States	Basketball	2019	Diuretic	25 games	
Laura Azevedo	Brazil	Swimming		Anabolic steroids		
Tariq Aziz	Pakistan	Field hockey		Cannabis		
Villalobos Azofeifa	Costa Rica	Cycling		GW501516		
Ahmed Abdelwahed	Italy	Athletics		Meldonium		
