= List of doping cases in sport (R) =

This is a sub-list from List of doping cases in sport representing a full list of surnames starting with R.

Name	Country	Event	Banned substance(s)	Reference(s)
Kagiso Rabada	South Africa	Cricket	Recreational drugs	
Andreea Răducan	Romania	Gymnastics	Pseudoephedrine	
Fernando Rafael	Argentina	Weightlifting	Clenbuterol	
Nursultan Rakhatov	Kazakhstan	Weightlifting	Stanozolol	
Robin Rahm	Sweden	Ice hockey	Anabolic steroids	
Singh Rahuveer	Iran	Volleyball	Norandrosterone	
Satheesha Rai	India	Weightlifting		
Tim Raines Sr.	United States	Baseball	Cocaine	
Mario Rajola	Italy	Swimming	Cannabis	
Edwin Raju	India	Weightlifting		
Ruslan Ramazanov	Turkmenistan	Weightlifting	Norandrosterone	
Kléber Ramos	Brazil	Cycling	Erythropoietin (EPO)	
Fernando Romboli	Brazil	Tennis		
Elmira Ramileva	Uzbekistan	Weightlifting	Stanozolol	
Manny Ramirez	Dominican Republic	Baseball	Performance Enhancing Drugs	
Kevin Randleman	United States	Mixed martial arts	Submitting fake urine sample	
Sunita Rani	India	Weightlifting	Norandrosterone	
Hussain Rashed	United Arab Emirates	Weightlifting	Stanozolol, Hydroxystanozolol	
Alex Rasmussen	Denmark	Cycling	Missed test	
Michael Rasmussen	Denmark	Cycling	Blood doping, cortisone, DHEA, EPO, growth hormone, IGF-1, insulin, testosterone	
Tamerlan Rasuev	Russia	Wrestling	Stanozolol	
Eddy Ratti	Italy	Cycling	EPO	
Mihai Ravariu	Romania	Rugby union	hCG	
Kiefer Ravena	Philippines	Basketball	methylhexanamine, 1,3-Dimethylbutylamine, higenamine	
Josh Ravin	United States	Baseball	GHRP-2	
Alexandr Razdrobenko	Belarus	Swimming	Clenbuterol	
Igor Razoronov	Ukraine	Weightlifting	Nandrolone	
Shawn Ray	United States	Bodybuilding	Anabolic steroid	
Rita Razmaite	Lithuania	Cycling	Bromantan	
William Rees-Hole	United Kingdom	Rugby union	Clenbuterol	
Dermot Reeve	United Kingdom	Cricket	Cannabis	
Abdur Rehman	Pakistan	Cricket	Cannabis	
Stephen Rehrmann	United States	Swimming	Pseudoephedrine	
Andris Reinholds	Latvia	Rowing	Nandrolone	
Rica Reinisch	East Germany	Swimming	Turinabol (self-admitted)	
Werner Reiterer	Australia	Athletics	Admitted drug use	
Peter Ribe	Norway	Canoeing	Ephedrine	(in Norwegian)
Ricardo Riccò	Italy	Cycling	CERA	
Wayne Richards	Australia	Rugby league	Anabolic steroids	
Micheal Ray Richardson	United States	Basketball	Cocaine	
Sha'Carri Richardson	United States	Sprinting	Cannabis	
Maximiliano Richeze	Argentina	Cycling	steroid	
Bjarne Riis	Denmark	Cycling	EPO, cortisone, growth hormone (self-admitted)	
Samantha Riley	Australia	Swimming	Dextropropoxyphene (later exonerated due to no fault)	
Ryan Rimouski	Canada	Association football	Performance enhancing drugs	
Juan Rincón	Venezuela	Baseball	Steroids	
Willie Rioli	Australia	Australian rules football	Submitting fake urine sample	
Danny Rios	United States	Baseball	Stanozolol	
Alessandro Rivellini	Italy	Swimming	EPO	
Barret Robbins	United States	American football	THG	
Grant Roberts	United States	Baseball	Steroids	
Stanley Roberts	United States	Basketball	"amphetamine-based designer drug"	
Ana Rodrigues	Portugal	Water polo	Canrenone	
Charles Roche	France	Water polo	Cannabis	
Aikaterini Roditi	Greece	Weightlifting	Methyltrienolone, Buprenorphine	
Miguel Rodrigues	Portugal	Swimming	Methylhexaneamine	
Alex Rodriguez	United States	Baseball	Testosterone, primobolan	
Ángel Rodríguez	Spain	Motorcycle racing		
Estella Rodriguez Villanueva	Cuba	Judo	Furosemide	
Luis Rojas	Venezuela	Swimming	Missed test	
Andrea Rolle	Italy	Water polo	Cannabis	
David Rollins	United States	Baseball	Stanozolol	
Luis Román Rolón	Puerto Rico	Boxing		
Bill Romanowski	United States	American football	Steroids (self-admitted)	
Romario	Brazil	Football (soccer)	Finasteride	
J. C. Romero	Puerto Rico	Baseball	Androstenedione	
Helen Rorive	Belgium	Volleyball	S5 diuretics/Acetazolamide	
Eddie Rosario	Puerto Rico	Baseball	"drug of abuse"	
Jarno Rosberg	Finland	Boxing	Methandrostenolone	
Loren Ross	United States	Boxing		
Alexandru Rosu	Romania	Weightlifting	T/E 14	
Wolfgang Rottmann	Austria	Biathlon	Violation of blood doping rules	
Maralla Roudayna	Syria	Swimming	Ephedrine	
Didier Rous	France	Cycling	Erythropoietin (EPO)	
Hugo Roux	France	Water polo	Cannabis	
Fatullaev Rovshan	Argentina	Weightlifting	Metandienone	
Judson Rowbotham	Canada	Rugby	Cannabis	
Michal Rubáček	Czech Republic	Swimming	Methylhexaneamine	
Ammar Rubaiaawi	Iraq	Weightlifting	Metandienone	
Carlos Ruiz	Panama	Baseball	Amphetamine	
Lazaro Ruiz	Cuba	Weightlifting	Boldenone	
Randy Ruiz	United States	Baseball		
Graeme Rummans	Australia	Cricket	Probenecid	
Raimondas Rumšas	Lithuania	Cycling		
Andrey Russkikh	Russia	Cycling		
Esmatullah Rustam Khil	Afghanistan	Weightlifting	Clostedol, Methylhexaneamine	
Stefan Rütimann	Switzerland	Cycling	testosterone	
Andrey Rybakov	Russia	Weightlifting		
Jesse Ryder	New Zealand	Cricket	1-Phenylbutan-2-amine (PBA) and N, alphadiethyl-benzeneethanamine (DEBEA)	
Aleksandr Rytchkov	Russia	Football	cannabis	
