= List of doping cases in sport (M) =

This is a sub-list from List of doping cases in sport representing a full list of surnames starting with M.

Name	Country	Event	Banned substance(s)	Reference(s)
Ma Wenhua	China	Weightlifting		
Mbulelo Mabizela	South Africa	Football (soccer)	Cannabis	
Enzo Maccarinelli	United Kingdom	Boxing	Methylhexaneamine (MHA)	
Adam MacDougall	Australia	Rugby league	Ephedrine, Amfepramone	
Ariel Machado	Brazil	Kickboxing		
Robert Machado	Venezuela	Baseball		
Krishnan Madasamy	India	Weightlifting		
Wesley Madhevere	Zimbabwe	Cricket	Recreational drugs	
Gustavo Madureira	Portugal	Swimming	Terbutaline	
Gouda Maged	Egypt	Weightlifting	Stanozolol, Hydroxystanozolol	
Brian Magee	United Kingdom	Boxing	Oxilofrine	
Maurren Maggi	Brazil	Athletics	Clostebol	(in Portuguese)
Emmanuel Magnien	France	Cycling	Corticoids	
Salma Hassan Mahmoud	Egypt	Volleyball	Steroids	
Sean Mahoney	United States	Swimming	Methylhexaneamine	
Bill Mahood	Canada	Mixed martial arts	Drostanolone	
Roman Maikin	Russia	Cycling		
Reni Maitua	Australia	Rugby (NRL)	Clenbuterol	
Igor Majcen	Slovenia	Swimming		
Aleksandra Majda	Poland	Swimming	Ephedrine	
Aleksej Makarov	Croatia	Volleyball	Methylhexaneamine	
Joel Makencie	Cuba	Weightlifting	Metandienone	
Adam Maklari	Hungary	Water polo	Methandienone	
Nikita Maksimov	Russia	Swimming	Oral-Turinabol	
Jehad Malalla	Brunei	Weightlifting	Methylhexanamine	
Xavier Malisse	Belgium	Tennis	Missed test	
Brian Mallette	United States	Baseball		
Daniel Maloney	United Kingdom	Weightlifting	Anabolic steroids	
Daniel Malvino	Brazil	Wrestling	Anabolic steroids	
Brandon Mann	United States	Baseball	Ostarine	
Mitchil Mann	Australia	Weightlifting	Clenbuterol	
Milka Maneva	Bulgaria	Weightlifting	Steroids	
Andrea Mangiante	Italy	Swimming	Testosterone	
Daniele Mannini	Italy	Football (soccer)	Missed test	
Ahmed Mansour	Egypt	Wrestling	Methylhexaneamine	
Eero Mäntyranta	Finland	Cross-country skiing	Amphetamine	
Ilya Manukhov	Canada	Wrestling	Letrozole	
Jesús Manzano	Spain	Cycling	EPO, Cortisone, testosterone, human growth hormone, nandrolone, oxyglobin	
Diego Maradona	Argentina	Football (soccer)	Cocaine (1991), Ephedrine (1994), Cocaine metabolites (1997)	
Lisa Marangon	Australia	Triathlon	Ostarine	
Kornelia Marek	Poland	Cross-Country Skiing	Erythropoietin (EPO)	
Ohman Maria	India	Weightlifting	Metandienone	
Peter Markoch	Croatia	Swimming	Cannabis	
Georgi Markov	Bulgaria	Weightlifting	Steroids, tampering with test	
Ivan Markov	Bulgaria	Weightlifting	Steroids	
Nate Marquardt	United States	mixed martial arts	Nandrolone	
Mariana Marques	Portugal	Swimming	Methylprednisolone	
Nidia Rosa Pardo Marrugo	Colombia	Weightlifting		
Cory Marsh	Canada	Gymnastics	Methylhexaneamine	
Mark Marshall	Jamaica	Football (soccer)	methylhexaneamine	
Alfredo Marte	Dominican Republic	Baseball	Stanozolol	
Starling Marte	Dominican Republic	Baseball	Nandrolone	
Benjamin Martel	Canada	Cycling	Testosterone	
Matsa Martha	Greece	Swimming	Stanozolol	
Carlos Martinez	Canada	Canadian football	Methylhexaneamine	
Maria Martinez	Argentina	Weightlifting	Boldenone	
Marvin Martinez	El Salvador	Weightlifting		
Paolo Martini	Italy	Water polo	Cannabis	
Claudia Martino	Italy	Water polo	Pseudoephedrine	
Paloma Garcia Martorell	Brazil	Water polo	Methylhexaneamine	
Landon Marzullo	United States	Swimming	Cannabis	
Saeed Abdul Hameed Marwan	Yemen	Weightlifting		
Amina Maskhadova	Russia	Weightlifting		
Sergej Maslobojev	Lithuania	Kickboxing	Metabolite of stanozolol	
Mohamed Masoud	Egypt	Weightlifting	Methylhexanamine	
Rodolfo Massi	Italy	Cycling	Cortisone	
Petar Majstorović	Switzerland	Kickboxing		
Francis Martes	Dominican Republic	Baseball	Clomiphene	
Fernando Martínez	Dominican Republic	Baseball	Performance-enhancing drugs	
Orelvis Martínez	Dominican Republic	Baseball	Clomiphene	
Rhys Mathieson	Australia	Australian rules football	Oxymetholone	
Kaloyan Zdravkov Matliev	Bulgaria	Swimming	Methylhexaneamine	
Martha Matsa	Greece	Swimming	Stanozolol	
Maxim Matveyev	Russia	Weightlifting		
Tomas Matykiewicz	Czech Republic	Weightlifting		
Brandon Mavuta	Zimbabwe	Cricket	Recreational drugs	
Cameron Maybin	United States	Baseball	Amphetamine	
Jeremy Mayfield	United States	Auto racing	Amphetamine	
O. J. Mayo	United States	Basketball	Dehydroepiandrosterone	
Filip Mazanik	Czech Republic	Water polo	Cannabis	
Iain McCorkindale	England	Ten-pin bowling	Benzoylecgonine	
Sean McCully	United States	Mixed martial arts	Nandrolone	
Daniel McCutchen	United States	Baseball	Methenolone, trenbolone	
Kevin McDine	England	Darts	Cocaine	
Darnell McDonald	United States	Baseball		
John McEnroe	United States	Tennis	Cocaine (self-admitted after retirement), steroids (self-admitted after retirement)	
Mitch McGary	United States	Basketball	Marijuana	
Mark McGwire	United States	Baseball	Steroids (self-admitted after retirement; Major League Baseball did not test for steroids during his career)	
Andrew McKirahan	United States	Baseball	Ipamorelin	
Duncan McLean	Canada	Canadian football		
Brigitte McMahon	Switzerland	Triathlon	Erythropoietin	
Tim McNeill	United States	Gymnastics	Triamcinolone acetonide	
David Meca	Spain	Swimming	Nandrolone	
Ericka Medrano	El Salvador	Weightlifting		
Jodie Meeks	United States	Basketball	Ipamorelin, GHRP-2	
Nishant Mehra	India	Football (soccer)	THC	
Roland Meier	Switzerland	Cycling	Erythropoietin (EPO)	
Birgit Meineke	East Germany	Swimming	Turinabol (self-admitted)	
Filip Meirhaeghe	Belgium	Cycling	Erythropoietin (EPO)	
Jenrry Mejía	Dominican Republic	Baseball	Stanozolol, Boldenone	
Oussama Mellouli	Tunisia	Swimming	Amphetamine	(in Dutch)
Marcelo Melo	Brazil	Tennis	Isometheptene	
Sergio Mendoza	Honduras	Football (soccer)	Steroid	
Joey Meneses	Mexico	Baseball	Stanozolol	
Simon Mensing	England	Football (soccer)	Methylhexaneamine	
Eddy Merckx	Belgium	Cycling	Reactivan, lodinated glycerol, Pemoline	
Jordan Meredith	Canada	Canadian football		
Shawne Merriman	United States	American football	Steroid	
Fadi Merza	Austria	Kickboxing		
Kevin Mestdagh	Belgium	Water polo	Cocaine	
Nazih Samer Mezayek	Jordan	Swimming	Nandrolone	
Ammar Mezghiche	Algeria	Weightlifting	Norandrosterone	
Piotr Michalski	Poland	Water polo	Cannabis	
Jeff Michels	United States	Weightlifting	Testosterone	
Luca Michieletto	Italy	Water polo	Cannabis	
Ninel Miculsecu	Romania	Weightlifting	T/E 19	
Mark Middleton	United Kingdom	Weightlifting	Methyltestosterone, testosterone	
Mike Mihelic	Canada	Canadian football		
Mikayel Mikayelyan	Armenia	Weightlifting	Stanozolol	
Andrei Mikhalyov	Belarus	Ice hockey	Methylhexaneamine	
Youri Mikulchin	Russia	Water polo	Carphedon	
Toni Milanović	Croatia	Muay Thai	Boldenone, salbutamol and methylhexanamine	
Harry Milanzi	Zambia	Football (soccer)	Cannabis	
Darius Miles	United States	Basketball	Phentarmine	
David Millar	United Kingdom	Cycling	Erythropoietin (EPO)	
Jarrell Miller	United States	Boxing	GW501516, EPO, growth hormone	
Eddie Milner	United States	Baseball	Cocaine	
Sevdalin Minchev	Bulgaria	Weightlifting	Furosemide	
Donka Mincheva	Bulgaria	Weightlifting	Steroids	
Richa Mishra	India	Swimming	Methylhexaneamine	
Sergio Mitre	United States	Baseball	Halodrol	
Victor Mitrov	Greece	Weightlifting	Methyltrienolone, Buprenorphine	
Artak Mkrtchyan	Armenia	Weightlifting	Metandienone	
Mostafa Mohamed	Egypt	Wrestling	Methylhexaneamine	
Saufik Mohd	Malaysia	Weightlifting	Metandienone	
Denis Moiseev	Russia	Rowing		
Fabiola Molina	Brazil	Swimming	Methylhexaneamine	
Bjarne Møller	Denmark	Triathlon	Erythropoietin (EPO) (self-admitted)	(in Danish)
Claus Michael Møller	Denmark	Cycling		
Miskander Momynbekov	Kyrgyzstan	Weightlifting	Stanozolol	
Salvatore Monaco	Italy	Football (soccer)	Nandrolone	
Shane Monahan	United States	Baseball	Deca-Durabolin, Winstrol & amphetamines Self-admitted in 2007, last played in minors 2003.	
Marisol Monasteriodos	Spain	Weightlifting	Heptaminol	
Adalberto Mondesí	United States	Baseball	Clenbuterol	
Gianpaolo Mondini	Italy	Cycling	Erythropoietin (EPO)	
Scott Moninger	United States	Cycling	19-norandrosterone	
Malik Monk	United States	Basketball		
Zachary Monsees	United States	Swimming	Cannabis	
Franck Montagny	France	Auto Racing	Cocaine	
Frankie Montas	Dominican Republic	Baseball	Ostarine	
Agustin Montero	Dominican Republic	Baseball		
Jesús Montero	Venezuela	Baseball	Performance-enhancing drugs, dimethylbutylamine	
Erik Morales	Mexico	Boxing	Clenbuterol	
Jarosław Morawiecki	Poland	Ice hockey	Testosterone	
Josh Moreau	United States	Weightlifting	Cannabinoids	
Christophe Moreau	France	Cycling	Erythropoietin (EPO) (self admitted)	
Rui Moreira	Portugal	Swimming	Cannabis	
Cristian Moreni	Italy	Cycling	Testosterone	
María Isabel Moreno	Spain	Cycling	Erythropoietin (EPO)	
Alexander Morgunov	Russia	Swimming	Norandrosterone, Noretiocholanolone	
Franck Morland	France	Water polo	Cocaine	
Niccolò Mornati	Italy	Rowing	Anastrozole	
Luca Moro	Italy	Auto racing	Benzoylecgonine	
Daniel Moro Fernandez	Spain	Water polo	Cannabis	
Ivan Moro Fernandez	Spain	Water polo	Cannabis	
John Moroney	Ireland	Rugby	Cannabis	
Johnnie Morton	United States	Mixed martial arts	anabolic steroids	
Mike Morse	United States	Baseball	Steroids	
Ksenia Moskvina	Russia	Swimming		
Shane Mosley	United States	Boxing	Tetrahydrogestrinone (THG, also known as "the clear"), Erythropoietin (EPO), and The cream	
Ezequiel Mosquera	Spain	Cycling	Hydroxyethyl starch	
Guillermo Mota	Dominican Republic	Baseball		
Said Moulla	Morocco	Wrestling	Stanozolol, Boldenone	
Bradley Mousley	Australia	Tennis	Ecstasy	
Mykhailo Mudryk	Ukraine	Football (soccer)	Meldonium	
Johann Mühlegg	Spain	Cross-country skiing	Darbepoetin	
Jarrod Mullen	Australia	Rugby league	Drostanolone	
David Munyasia	Kenya	Boxing	Stimulant	
Giuseppe Muraglia	Italy	Cycling	hCG (Human chorionic gonadotropin)	
Amar Muralidharan	India	Swimming	Methylhexaneamine	
Sam Murray	Australia	Australian rules football	Cocaine	
Thomas Murre	France	Beach volleyball	Cannabinoids	
Johan Museeuw	Belgium	Cycling	Aranesp-darbepoetin alfa	(self-admitted)
Anatoliy Mushyk	Israel	Weightlifting	T/E 9.8	
Murtazali Muslimov	Azerbaijan	Wrestling	Arostanolone metabolite and oxandrolone metabolites	
Halil Mutlu	Turkey	Weightlifting	Anabolic steroids	
Adrian Mutu	Romania	Football (soccer)	Cocaine	
Jenna Myers	Australia	Weightlifting		
Mika Myllylä	Finland	Cross-country skiing	HES	
