= List of doping cases in sport (K) =

This is a sub-list from List of doping cases in sport representing a full list of surnames starting with K.

Name	Country	Event	Banned substance(s)	Reference(s)
Alina Kabaeva	Russia	Rhythmic gymnastics	Furosemide	
Alimuddin Kakar	Pakistan	Weightlifting		
Georgios Kalogeropoulos	Greece	Swimming	Cannabis	
Mohamed Kallon	Sierra Leone	Football (soccer)	Nandrolone	
Kaspars Kambala	Latvia	Basketball	Cocaine metabolite	
Ruslan Kapaev	Kyrgyzstan	Weightlifting		
Tovmasjan Karen	Netherlands	Weightlifting	Metandienone	
Rogerio Karfunkelstein	Brazil	Swimming	Stanozolol	
Faisal Karim	Pakistan	Boxing	Cannabis	
Nauman Karim	Pakistan	Boxing		
Mario Kasun	Croatia	Basketball	Cathine	
Kevin Kasuza	Zimbabwe	Cricket	Recreational drugs	
Sesil Karatantcheva	Bulgaria	Tennis	Nandrolone	
Svend Karlsen	Norway	Strongmen		
Mohd Karmand	Afghanistan	Weightlifting	Methandienone	
Samko Karol	Slovakia	Weightlifting	Drostanolone	
Fetie Kasaj	Albania	Weightlifting		(in Norwegian)
Vasiliki Kasapi	Greece	Weightlifting	Methyltrienolone, Buprenorphine	
Andrey Kashechkin	Kazakhstan	Cycling	Blood doping	
Asmaa Kataria	Egypt	Swimming	Ephedrine	
Mohamed Katir	Spain	Athletics	3 whereabouts failures in a 12-month period and tampering with an anti-doping investigation	
Gursharanpreet Kaur	India	Wrestling	Methylhexaneamine	
Valeriya Kaverina	Russia	Weightlifting	Metandienone	
Devi Kavita	India	Weightlifting	Metandienone	
Valery Kaykov	Russia	Cycling	GW501516	
Kboi	Vietnam	Weightlifting	Testosterone, Epitestosterone	
Zoltan Kecskes	Hungary	Weightlifting		
Lachlan Keeffe	Australia	Australian rules football	Clenbuterol	
Ronwin Kelly	South Africa	Rugby union (former bodybuilder)	Nandrolone	
Robert Kendrick	United States	Tennis	Methylhexaneamine	
Daniel Kenedy	Portugal	Football (soccer)	Furosemide	
Martin Kennedy	Australia	Rugby League	SARMS, growth hormone, chorionic gonadotrophin, insulin	
Paddy Kenny	Ireland	Football (soccer)	ephedrine	
David Kerkhoffs	Belgium	Swimming	Cannabinoids	
Jason Kerr	Canada	Bobsleigh	Boldenone, nandrolone, testosterone, trenbolone	
Paul-Alain Kersale	France	Swimming	Cannabinoids	
Matthias Kessler	Germany	Cycling	Testosterone	
El Maoui Khalil	Tunisia	Weightlifting	Methylhexaneamine	
Naglaa Hamed Khallaf	Egypt	Weightlifting	Stanozolol	
Vitaliy Khan	Kazakhstan	Swimming	Cannabis	
Masuam Khatri	India	Wrestling	Methylhexaneamine	
Praeonapa Khenjantuek	Thailand	Weightlifting	Metandienone	
Nan Aye Khine	Myanmar	Weightlifting	Steroids	
Natalia Khlestkina	Romania	Weightlifting	Metenolone	
Bahodur Kholov	Tajikistan	Weightlifting	Nandrolone	
Yaroslav Khoma	Ukraine	Football (soccer)		
Albina Khomich	Russia	Weightlifting	Anabolic steroids	
Yekaterina Khoroshikh	Russia	Hammer throwing		
Natalya Khudyakova	Ukraine	Swimming	Stanozolol	
Oksana Khvostenko	Ukraine	Biathlon		
Zbyszko Kienast	United Kingdom	Weightlifting	Testosterone	
Rotson Kilambe	Zambia	Football (soccer)	Cannabis	
Kazbek Kilou	Belarus	Wrestling	Metenolone	
Igor Kim	Kazakhstan	Weightlifting	Furosemide, T/E 21.4	
Kim Jong Su	North Korea	Shooting	Propanolol	
Hyang Kim	North Korea	Weightlifting	Methyltestosterone, Methandriol	
Vivian Kingma	Netherlands	Cricket	Benzoylecgonine	
Matt Kinney	United States	Baseball	Amphetamines	
Gerard Kinsella	England	Football (soccer)	Nandrolone	
Gergana Kirilova	Bulgaria	Weightlifting	Steroids	
Harri Kirvesniemi	Finland	Cross-country skiing	HES	
Karolin Kittel	Germany	Swimming	Refusal to submit to doping test	
Steffen Kjærgaard	Norway	Cycling		
Boonnatee Klakasikit	Thailand	Weightlifting	Methandienone	
Sarah Klein	Australia	Athletics	Failure to provide testing sample	
Rory Kleinveldt	South Africa	Cricket	Marijuana	
Ivan Klim	Belarus	Weightlifting	Stanozolol	
Vitali Klitschko	Ukraine	Boxing	Anabolic steroids (self-admitted)	
Kasem Knakri	Syria	Weightlifting		
Tonya Knight	United States	Bodybuilding	Using a stand-in when chosen for a random drug test	
Bernhard Kohl	Austria	Cycling	CERA	
Francis Kombe	Zambia	Football (soccer)	Cannabis	
Anton Komlev	Russia	Swimming		
Izabela Kondraszuk	Poland	Gymnastics	Dimethylpentylamine	
Yoann Kongolo	Switzerland	Kickboxing	Methandrostenolone and stanozolol	
Steven Koops	Australia	Australian rules football	Pethidine	
Mouhanad Korabi	Syria	Weightlifting	Stanozolol, Metenolone, Methyltestosterone	
Olha Korbka	Ukraine	Weightlifting	Methandienone	
Petr Korda	Czech Republic	Tennis	Nandrolone	
Juha Korhonen	Finland	Swimming	Cannabis	
Albert Korir	Kenya	Athletics	CERA	
Andrey Korneyev	Russia	Swimming	Bromantan	
Chris Korol	Canada	Bobsleigh		
Ekaterina Koroleva	Russia	Cycling		
Anzhelika Kotyuga	Belarus	Speed skating	Anabolic steroids	
Eleni Kourtelidou	Greece	Weightlifting	Methyltrienolone, Buprenorphine	
Nikos Kourtidis	Greece	Weightlifting		
Zoltán Kovács	Hungary	Weightlifting	Refusal to provide test	
Justyna Kowalczyk	Poland	Cross-country skiing	Dexamethason	
Kateryna Kozlova	Ukraine	Tennis	1,3-Dimethylbutylamine	
Nina Kraft	Germany	Triathlon	Erythropoietin (EPO)	
Natascha Kraus	Germany	Swimming	Reproterol	
Daniel Kreutzer	Germany	Ice hockey	Missed test	
Tobias Kreuzmann	Germany	Swimming	Finasteride	
Lennie Kristensen	Denmark	Cycling		
Ante Krizan	Croatia	Swimming	Methylhexaneamine	
Lubos Krizko	Slovakia	Swimming	Tamoxifen	
Karen Kronemeyer	Netherlands	Squash	Benzylpiperazine	
Stein Olav Krosby	Norway	Speed skating, long track	Testosterone	
Roman Kryklia	Ukraine	Kickboxing	Meldonium, clenbuterol	
Andrey Krylov	Russia	Gymnastics	THC	
Herkie Kruger	South Africa	Rugby union	Nandrolone	
Vasyl Kruk	Ukraine	Weightlifting	Stanozolol, testosterone	
Ondrej Kruzel	Slovakia	Weightlifting	Drostanolone	
Virpi Kuitunen	Finland	Cross-Country skiing		
Galina Kulakova	Russia	Cross-Country skiing	Ephedrine	
Pavel Kulizhnikov	Russia	Speed skating	Methylhexanamine, Meldonium	
Sumit Kumar	India	Wrestling	Methylhexanamine	
Saliya Kumara	Sri Lanka	Rugby union	Methylhexanamine	
Pratima Kumari	India	Weightlifting		
Ouyang Kunpeng	China	Swimming	Clenbuterol	
Dimitar Kutrovsky	Bulgaria	Tennis		
Alexi Kutsenko	Russia	Swimming	Testosterone	
Ruza Kuzieva	Uzbekistan	Powerlifting	Methandienone	
Albert Kuzilov	Georgia	Weightlifting	Metandienone	
Zhassulan Kydyrbayev	Kazakhstan	Weightlifting	Stanozolol	
Nick Kyrgios	Australia	Tennis	Cocaine	
Artur Kyshenko	Ukraine	Kickboxing		
