= List of doping cases in sport (G) =

This is a sub-list from List of doping cases in sport representing a full list of surnames starting with G.

Name	Country	Event	Banned substance(s)	Reference(s)
Mohammed Gaber	Egypt	Weightlifting		
Ivailo Gabrovski	Bulgaria	Cycling	EPO	
Al-Saadi Gaddafi	Libya	Football (soccer)	Nandrolone	
Éric Gagné	Canada	Baseball	Human growth hormone	
Alexander Gaidukov	Russia	Water polo	Carphedon	
Martin Galia	Slovenia	Handball	Octopamine	
Aaron Galindo	Mexico	Football (soccer)	Nandrolone	
Luiza Galiulina	Uzbekistan	Gymnastics	Furosemide	
Freddy Galvis	Venezuela	Baseball	Clostebol	
Eddie Gamboa	United States	Baseball	Testosterone	
Gao Yanzhi	China	Weightlifting		
Ricky Garard	Australia	CrossFit	GW501516, Vosilasarm	
Ismael Garcia Bravo	Spain	Swimming	Ephedrine	
Sergio Garcia Ortiz	Spain	Swimming		
Juan Garriga	Spain	Motorcycle racing	(never sanctioned; admitted to use after the end of his career)	
Lukasz Gasior	Poland	Swimming	Cannabis	
Richard Gasquet	France	Tennis	Cocaine (later forgiven by the excuse that he kissed a girl who used cocaine)	
Stefano Garzelli	Italy	Cycling	Probenecid	
Philippe Gaumont	France	Cycling	Erythropoietin (EPO) (self-admitted)	
Michael Gausman	United States	Swimming	Cannabinoids	
Vikas Singh Gautam	France	Volleyball	Steroids	
Anzhelika Gavrilova	Kazakhstan	Speed skating	Clenbuterol	
Steve Geltz	United States	Baseball	Non-performance-enhancing drug	
Pauline Gendrier	France	Volleyball	Cocaine	
Ivan Gertlein	Russia	Pole vaulting	DHEA	
Sylvain Georges	France	Cycling	Heptaminol	
Tihomir Georgiev	Bulgaria	Volleyball	Cannabinoids	
Amanda Gerhart	Canada	Wrestling	Refusal to submit to doping test	
Dinko Geshev	Poland	Swimming	Cannabis	
Ute Geweniger	East Germany	Swimming	Turinabol (self-admitted)	
Alireza Gharibi	Iran	Wrestling	D-methamphetamine	
Jason Giambi	United States	Baseball	Human growth hormone, steroids (self-admitted)	
Jeremy Giambi	United States	Baseball	Human growth hormone, steroids (self-admitted)	
Jay Gibbons	United States	Baseball	Growth hormone	
Lewis Gibbons	United Kingdom	Football (soccer)	Benzoylecgonine, cannabis	
Jack Gibbs	United Kingdom	Wheelchair basketball		
Monica Gibellini	Italy	Water polo	Cannabinoids	
Ed Giddins	England	Cricket	Cocaine	
Lukasz Giminski	Poland	Swimming		
Felice Gimondi	Italy	Cycling		
Everton Giovanella	Brazil	Football (soccer)		
Christopher Girard	Canada	Water polo	Cannabis	
Mads Glaesner	Denmark	Swimming	Levomethamphetamine	
Martin Gleeson	United Kingdom	Rugby	Methylhexaneamine	
Josh Glenn	Australia	Australian rules football	19-Norandrosterone, 19-Noretiocholanolone	
Ekaterina Gnidenko	Russia	Cycling	Dehydrochlormethyltestosterone (Turinabol)	
Anthony Gobert	Australia	Motorcycle racing	Cannabis (Not sanctioned for first offence, but was released from contract by team)	
Luis Pereira Melo Godinho	Portugal	Volleyball	Cannabinoids	
Babak Goldasteh	Iran	Wrestling	Anabolic steroids	
Andreas Goldberger	Austria	Ski jumping	Cocaine	
Daria Goltsova	Russia	Weightlifting	Cocaine	
Derlis Gómez	Paraguay	Football (soccer)	Coca	
Joellison Viana de Silva Gomez	Brazil	Weightlifting	Methylhexaneamine	
Papu Gómez	Argentina	Football (soccer)	Terbutaline	
Kerem Gönlüm	Turkey	Basketball	Cathine	
Aitor González	Spain	Cycling	Methyltestosterone metabolite	
Luis González	Venezuela	Baseball	Amphetamines	
Dee Gordon	United States	Baseball	Exogenous Testosterone and Clostebol	
Dwight Gooden	United States	Baseball	Cocaine	
Besarion Goshashvili	Georgia	Wrestling	Furosemide	
Anna Gostomelsky	Israel	Swimming	Prednisolone	
Ólafur Gottskálksson	Iceland	Football (soccer)		
Lauren Goulart	Brazil	Swimming	Methylhexaneamine	
Royce Gracie	Brazil	Mixed martial arts	Nandrolone metabolite	
Sam Grammer	United States	Highland Games		
Johan Granath	Sweden	Speed skating	Unknown substance	
Yasmani Grandal	Cuba	Baseball	Testosterone	
Guy Greavette	Canada	Weightlifting	Anabolic steroids	
Robbie Green	United Kingdom	Darts	Cannabis	
Elen Grigoryan	Armenia	Weightlifting	Methandienone	
Jason Grimsley	United States	Baseball	Amphetamines, anabolic steroids, human growth hormone, (self-admitted)	
Kevin Grubb	United States	Auto Racing	Refusal to submit to doping control	
Firas Guachai	Tunisia	Swimming	Testosterone	
Pep Guardiola	Spain	Football (soccer)	Nandrolone	
Elzo Guerra Aranoz	Chile	Weightlifting	Methandienone	
Melvin Guillard	United States	Mixed martial arts	Cocaine	
Zafar Guliyev	Russia	Wrestling	Bromantane	
Fabrizio Guidi	Italy	Cycling	Erythropoietin (EPO)	
Zahid Gulfam	Pakistan	Cycling	Nandrolone	
Ari Gunnarsson	Iceland	Swimming	19-Norandrosterone	
Mathias Gunthar	Sweden	Wrestling	Furosemide	
Guo Tianxin	China	Weightlifting	Clenbuterol	
Carlos Gurpegi	Spain	Football (soccer)	19-norandrosterone	
Keith Gurusinghe	Sri Lanka	Rugby union	Methylhexanamine	
Rebeca Gusmão	Brazil	Swimming	Testosterone; Tampering	
Ferenc Gyurkovics	Hungary	Weightlifting	Oxandrolone	
