= List of doping cases in sport (V) =

This is a sub-list from List of doping cases in sport representing a full list of surnames starting with V.

Name	Country	Event	Banned substance(s)	Reference(s)
Daniel Vaisocher	Czech Republic	Swimming	Ephedrine	
Jordany Valdespin	Dominican Republic	Baseball	Performance-enhancing drugs	
Jorge Valdez	Paraguay	Football (soccer)	Coca	
Kamila Valieva	Russia	Figure skating	Trimetazidine	
Tadej Valjavec	Slovenia	Cycling		
José Valverde	Dominican Republic	Baseball	Stanozolol	
Frank Vandenbroucke	Belgium	Cycling	Performance-enhancing drugs (self-admitted)	
Zlatan Vanev	Bulgaria	Weightlifting	Tampering with test	
Linda van Herk	Netherlands	Swimming	Refusal to submit to doping test	
Vasileios Vanvounakis	Greece	Water polo	Ephedrine	
Norik Vardanian	United States	Weightlifting	Cannabis	
Mikha Vardanyan	Armenia	Weightlifting	Dehydrochlormethyltestosterone	
Vladimir Varfolomeev	Russia	Rowing		
Fernando Vargas	United States	Boxing	Anabolic steroids	
Kaisa Varis	Finland	Cross-country skiing	Erythropoietin (EPO)	
Yineth Varon	Colombia	Football (soccer)		
Iliya Vasilev	Bulgaria	Swimming	Clenbuterol	
Dmitry Vassiliev	Russia	Ski jumping	Furosemide	
Carlos Vásquez	Venezuela	Baseball	Performance-enhancing substance	
Viktor Vatai	Hungary	Weightlifting	S8. Cannabinoids	
Geralee Vega Morales	Nigeria	Weightlifting	Methylhexanamine	
Juan Jose Veloz	Mexico	Swimming	Nandrolone	
Kicker Vencill	United States	Swimming	19-Norandrosterone	
Sven Verdonck	Belgium	Football (soccer)	Stanozolol	
Sebastien Verdoucq	Canada	Water polo	Cannabis	
Jerrel Venetiaan	Netherlands	Kickboxing	Elevated testosterone	
Stijn Vermeulen	Belgium	Swimming	Cannabis	
Michael Viau	Canada	Weightlifting	Anabolic steroids	
Chinthana Vidanage	Sri Lanka	Weightlifting	Methylhexanamine	
Pieter de Villiers	France	Rugby union	Cocaine, Ecstasy	
Alexander Vinokourov	Kazakhstan	Cycling	Blood doping	
Richard Virenque	France	Cycling		
Cobus Visagie	South Africa	Rugby		
Ľubomír Višňovský	Slovakia	Ice hockey	Pseudoephedrine (only given public warning)	
Arodys Vizcaíno	Dominican Republic	Baseball	Stanozolol	
Yakuta Vladzimir	Belarus	Weightlifting	Metandienone	
Nedarezava Volha	Belarus	Weightlifting		
Edinson Vólquez	Dominican Republic	Baseball	Performance-enhancing drug	
Markéta Vondroušová	Czech Republic	Tennis	Refusal to submit to doping test	
Nadzeya Vysotskaya	Belarus	Gymnastics	Furosemide	
