= List of doping cases in sport (H) =

This is a sub-list from List of doping cases in sport representing a full list of surnames starting with H.

Name	Country	Event	Banned substance(s)	Reference(s)
Yamid Haad	Colombia	Baseball	Performance-enhancing substance	
Milan Haborák	Slovakia	Shot put	Human chorionic gonadotropin, steroids	
Luther Hackman	United States	Baseball	Performance-enhancing substance	
Beatriz Haddad Maia	Brazil	Tennis	Enobosarm and Ligandrol	
Zakari Hadiza	Nigeria	Weightlifting	Stanozolol, Hydroxystanozolol	
Hae-In Shin	South Korea	Swimming	Testosterone	
Noriyuki Haga	Japan	Motorcycle racing	Ephedrine	
Simona Halep	Romania	Tennis	Roxadustat	
Alex Hales	England	Cricket	Recreational drugs	
Carey Hall	Australia	Cycling	Steroids	
Dennis Hallman	United States	Mixed martial arts	Drostanolone, Nandrolone	
Bo Hamburger	Denmark	Cycling	Erythropoietin (EPO) (admitted years after being cleared by CAS)	
Josh Hamilton	United States	Baseball	Cocaine	
Tyler Hamilton	United States	Cycling	Blood transfusions, EPO, Testosterone, DHEA (self-admitted)	
Morgan Hamm	United States	Gymnastics	Glucocorticosteroid (only given public warning)	
Mohammad Hanif	Pakistan	Bodybuilding		
Jessica Hardy	United States	Swimming	Clenbuterol	
Badr Hari	Morocco	Kickboxing		
Brad Harman	Australia	Baseball	Failing to advise authorities of whereabouts	
Jalen Harris	United States	Basketball		
Justin Harrison	England	Rugby		
Rodney Harrison	United States	American football	Human growth hormone	
Matthew Hart	New Zealand	Cricket	Cannabis	
Naira Harutyunyan	Armenia	Weightlifting	Stanozolol	
Raza Hasan	Pakistan	Cricket		
Ricky Hatton	United Kingdom	Boxing	Cocaine	
Gareth Head	Canada	Water polo	Cannabis	
Troy Hearfield	Australia	Football (soccer)	Recreational drugs	
Edwin Hedberg	Sweden	Ice hockey	Sibutramine	
Yepremyan Heghine	Armenia	Weightlifting	Metandienone	
Runar Heltne	Norway	Athletic	Trafficking, Administration, Complicity	
Christian Henn	Germany	Cycling	Erythropoietin (EPO) (self-admitted)	
Clay Hensley	United States	Baseball	Performance-enhancing substance	
Roberto Heras	Spain	Cycling	Erythropoietin (EPO)	
Aleksandra Herasimenia	Belarus	Swimming	Nandrolone	
Félix Heredia	Dominican Republic	Baseball	Steroids	
Keith Hernandez	United States	Baseball	Cocaine	
Oscar Hernández	Venezuela	Baseball	Non-performance-enhancing drug	
Vanessa Hernandez	France	Water polo	Cannabis	
Jonathan Herrera	Venezuela	Baseball	Performance-enhancing drug	
Pascal Herve	France	Cycling	Erythropoietin (EPO)	
Kelly Heuchen	Australia	Swimming	Refusal to submit to doping test	
Alex Higgins	United Kingdom	Snooker	Avoided test by disruption	
René Higuita	Colombia	Football (soccer)	Cocaine	
Giorgos Himonetos	Greece	Cycling	Steroid (stanozolol)	
Martina Hingis	Switzerland	Tennis	Cocaine	
Shane Hmiel	United States	Auto racing	Cocaine, Cannabis	
Thnat Zin Hnin	Myanmar	Weightlifting		
Anh Hoang	Vietnam	Weightlifting	Oxilfrine	
Aad van den Hoek	Netherlands	Cycling	Coramine	
Gareth Hock	England	Rugby League	Cocaine, benzoylecgonine	
Corran Hocking	Australia	Weightlifting	Benzylpiperazine	
Mary Hofer	United States	Swimming	Refusal to submit to doping test	
Jörg Hoffmann (swimmer)	East Germany	Swimming	Turinabol (self-admitted)	
Detlef Hofmann	Germany	Canoeing		
Gudrun Høie	Norway	Wrestling	Failure to reveal whereabouts	
Dusan Holas	Slovakia	Water polo	Hydrochlorothiazide	
Al Holland	United States	Baseball	Cocaine	
Brian Holm	Denmark	Cycling	Erythropoietin (EPO)	
Danilo Hondo	Germany	Cycling	Carphedon	
Mariano Hood	Argentina	Tennis	Finasteride	
Fader Hosni	Palestine	Weightlifting	Metandienone	
Camille Houdayer	France	Swimming	Cannabis	
Peter Howe	United Kingdom	Bobsleigh	Failure to submit to doping test	
Rodney Howe	Australia	Rugby league	Stanazolol	
Steve Howe	United States	Baseball	Cocaine	
Gemma Howells	United Kingdom	Swimming	Pseudoephedrine	
Miguel Hoyos	Bolivia	Football (soccer)	Dexamethasone	
LaMarr Hoyt	United States	Baseball	Cocaine	
Tatsiana Hramyka	Belarus	Weightlifting		
Jan Hruška	Czech Republic	Cycling		(in German)
Mustafa Hshad	Libya	Weightlifting	Metandienone	
Huang Tzu-Ching	Chinese Taipei	Weightlifting	Metandienone	
Hu Bin	China	Swimming		
Hu Shaozhi	China	Swimming	Clenbuterol	
Ryan Hudson	United Kingdom	Rugby league	Stanozolol	
Jaime Huelamo	Spain	Cycling		
Brent Hughes	United Kingdom	Ice hockey	Furosemide	
Liao Hui	China	Weightlifting	Boldenone, Androstatrienedione	
Daniela Hunger	East Germany	Swimming	Anabolic steroids (self-admitted)	
Gary Hunt	England	Diving	cannabis	
Lindsey Hunter	United States	Basketball	Phentermine	
Mohd Husein	Afghanistan	Weightlifting	Methandienone	
Ondřej Hutník	Czech Republic	Kickboxing	Hydroxystanozolol	
Martin Hvastija	Slovenia	Cycling		
