= List of doping cases in sport (N) =

This is a sub-list from List of doping cases in sport representing a full list of surnames starting with N.

Name	Country	Event	Banned substance(s)	Reference(s)
Caba Nadj	Serbia	Weightlifting	Methandienone	
Ammar Naji	Yemen	Weightlifting	Metandienone, Stanozolol, Hydroxystanozolol	
Kazuhiro Nakamura	Japan	Mixed martial arts	Cannabis	
Ryan Napoleon	Australia	Swimming	Formoterol	
Bayarmaa Namkhaidorj	Mongolia	Weightlifting	Methylhexaneamine	
Sireli Naqelevuki	Fiji	Rugby union	Cannabis	
Dion Nash	New Zealand	Cricket	Cannabis	
Ramin Nasri	Iran	Swimming	Betamethasone	
Samir Nasri	France	Football (soccer)	Excessive intravenous therapy	
Paweł Nastula	Poland	Mixed martial arts	Nandrolone	
Andris Naudužs	Latvia	Cycling	Anabolic steroid	(in Latvian)
Rostyslav Naumchyk	Ukraine	Water polo	Cannabis	
Mohammad Nawaz	Pakistan	Cricket	Carboxy-THC	
Peter Nemeth	Hungary	Weightlifting	Metandienone	
Pavel Nesterenko	Russia	Powerlifting		
Marek Nesvacil	Czech Republic	Volleyball	Cannabinoids	
Moisés Dueñas Nevado	Spain	Cycling	Erythropoietin (EPO)	
Hernâni Neves	Portugal	Football (soccer)	Cocaine	
Vania Neves	Portugal	Swimming	Prednisone	
Ryan Newport	United States	Tennis		
Shaun Newton	England	Football (soccer)	Cocaine	
Terry Newton	United Kingdom	Rugby	HGH	
Lars Brian Nielsen	Denmark	Cycling	Caffeine	
Mark Nielsen	New Zealand	Tennis	Finasteride	
Ivan Nieto Agundiz	Mexico	Weightlifting	Nandrolone	
Josefi Nikola	Czech Republic	Weightlifting		
Pornilai Nilpetch	Thailand	Weightlifting	Methandienone	
Patrik Nilson	Sweden	Ice hockey	Nandrolon	
Ulf Nilsson	Sweden	Ice hockey	Ephedrine	
Ning Zetao	China	Swimming	Clenbuterol	
J. Nithiyanandan	India	Swimming	Stanozolol	
Carola Nitschke	East Germany	Swimming	Anabolic steroids (self-admitted)	
Otis Nixon	United States	Baseball	Cocaine	
Sangov Nizom	Tajikistan	Weightlifting	Methylhexaneamine	
Joakim Noah	France	Basketball	LGD-4033	
Alexandre Nogueira	Brazil	Mixed martial arts	Boldenone	
Abdul Noori	Afghanistan	Weightlifting	T/E 14,6, Clostebol, Methylhexamine	
Jordan Norberto	Dominican Republic	Baseball	Performance-enhancing drugs	
Franny Norton	England	Horse racing	Metabolite of cocaine	
Anosheravan Nourian	Iran	Boxing	Ephedrine	
Karel Nováček	Czech Republic	Tennis	Cocaine	
Jan Novak	Czech Republic	Water polo	Cannabis	
Nikita Novikov	Russia	Cycling	Selective Androgen Receptor Modulators	
Joseph N'Sima	France	Basketball	Ephedrine	
Kanayut Nuchcharpenpol	Thailand	Weightlifting	Methandienone	
Abraham Núñez	Dominican Republic	Baseball	Performance-enhancing substance	
Daniel Núñez	Cuba	Weightlifting	Anabolic steroids	
Vanessa Nunez	Venezuela	Weightlifting	Metandienone	
Jon Nunnally	United States	Baseball	Furosemide	
Taylan Nurcan	Turkey	Weightlifting	Methandienone	
Nzubechi Grace Nwokocha	Nigeria	Track and Field	Ostarine and Ligandrol	
Ebba Nyberg	Sweden	Swimming	1,4,6-trien-3, 17dion	
Johan Nystrom	Finland	Weightlifting	Metandienone	
