= List of doping cases in sport (F) =

This is a sub-list from List of doping cases in sport representing a full list of surnames starting with F.

Name	Country	Event	Banned substance(s)	Reference(s)
Saad Faeaz	Iraq	Bodybuilding	Nandrolone	
Thomas Fagerli	Norway	Water polo	Cannabis	
Mouhamadou Fall	France	Athletics	Heptaminol	
Kieren Fallon	Ireland	Horse racing		
Thomas Fancutt	Australia	Tennis	IV fluid	
Robert Farah	Colombia	Tennis	Boldenone	
Leuzkis Farias	Venezuela	Weightlifting	Stanozolol	
Alexander Farnell	Canada	Swimming	Cannabis	
John Farnell	Canada	Water polo	Cannabis	
Svetlana Fedorova	Russia	Rowing		
Tiro Feras	Syria	Weightlifting	Clenbuterol	
Rio Ferdinand	England	Football (soccer)	Missed test	
Daniel Fernandes	Portugal	Football (soccer)	Dextroamphetamine	
Alexandre Batista Ferreira	Portugal	Volleyball	Cannabinoids	
Marco Fertonani	Italy	Cycling	Testosterone	
Mike Fibbens	United Kingdom	Swimming	Cocaine	
Laurent Fignon	France	Cycling	Amphetamine	
Aaron Fike	United States	Auto Racing	Heroin	
Mehmed Fikretov	Bulgaria	Weightlifting	Steroids	
Ivailo Filev	Bulgaria	Weightlifting	Steroids	
Mirko “Cro Cop” Filipović	Croatia	Mixed martial arts	Human growth hormone	
Nedim Fisic	Bosnia and Herzegovina	Weightlifting	Methandienone	
Gregoire Fischer	France	Water polo	Cannabis	
Sveinung Fjeldstad	Norway	Football (soccer)		(in Norwegian)
Stephen Fleming	New Zealand	Cricket	Cannabis	
Rachelle Fleurant	Canada	Bobsleigh	Clenbuterol, Hydrochlorothiazide, oxandrolone	
Dmitriy Fofonov	Kazakhstan	Cycling	Heptaminol	
Camilla Fogagnolo	Australia	Weightlifting		
Mabel Fonseca	Puerto Rico	Weightlifting	Stanozolol	
Eugenia Fontana	Argentina	Weightlifting	Nandrolone	
Hermes Franca	Brazil	Mixed martial arts	Drostanolone	
Samuel Francis	Qatar	Athletics	Stanozolol	
Ryan Franklin	United States	Baseball	Steroids	
Joe Frans	Canada	Curling	Cocaine	
Zdenek Frantisak	Czech Republic	Swimming	Epehdrine	
Dario Frigo	Italy	Cycling	Erythropoietin (EPO)	
William Frullani	Italy	Bobsleigh	Methylhexanamine	
Fu Bo	China	Swimming	Clenbuterol	
Fu Yong	China	Swimming		
Tyson Fury	United Kingdom	Boxing	Cocaine	
