= List of doping cases in sport (O) =

Comprehensive List as a result of Drug Abuse

This is a sub-list from List of doping cases in sport representing a full list of surnames starting with O.

Name	Country	Event	Banned substance(s)	Reference(s)
Kirk O'Bee	United States	Cycling	Testosterone	
Robbie O'Davis	Australia	Rugby league	Anabolic steroids	
Chiedozie Offiah	United Kingdom	Basketball	Test tampering	
Stuart O'Grady	Australia	Cycling	EPO (Self admit)	
Reza Ojagh	Iran	Swimming	Nandrolone	
Mirela Olczak	Poland	Swimming	Methylhexaneamine	
Olena Olefirenko	Ukraine	Rowing		
Ruslan Oleksenko	Ukraine	Wrestling	THC	
Andrey Oleynik	Ukraine	Swimming	Cannabis	
Jacques Oliger	Chile	Weightlifting		
Achiliev Olimbeck	United Arab Emirates	Weightlifting	Metandienone	
Victor Felipe Silveira Oliveira	Brazil	Volleyball	Steroids	
Graham Olling	Australia	Rugby league	Anabolic steroids	
Larry Olubamiwu	United Kingdom	Boxing		
Naiij Omid	Iran	Weightlifting	Metandienone	
Esther Omosehin	Nigeria	Swimming	Ephedrine	
André Onana	Cameroon	Football (soccer)	Furosemide	
Qazi Onik	Bangladesh	Cricket	Methamphetamine	
Nathan O'Neill	Australia	Cycling	Phentermine	
Elizabeth Onuah	Nigeria	Weightlifting	Hydrochlorothiazide, Amiloride	
Oo Mya Sanda	Myanmar	Weightlifting	Metabolite	
Niusila Opeloge	Samoa	Weightlifting		
Omar Ortiz	Mexico	Football (soccer)	Oxymetholone, masteron	
Michal Orzechowski	Poland	Wrestling	THC	
Ronnie O'Sullivan	England	Snooker	Cannabis	
Bilal Othman	Syria	Weightlifting		
Bilikis Otunla	Nigeria	Weightlifting	Nandrolone	
Abdelkrim Ouakali	Algeria	Wrestling	Furosemide	
Ouyang Kunpeng	China	Swimming	Clenbuterol	
Artem Ovechkin	Russia	Cycling		
Alistair Overeem	Netherlands	MMA and Kickboxing	Testosterone- Epitestosterone	
Mita Overvliet	Netherlands	Weightlifting	Norandrosterone, Furosemide	
Henry Owens	United States	Baseball	Performance-enhancing substance	
