= List of doping cases in sport (I) =

This is a sub-list from List of doping cases in sport representing a full list of surnames starting with I.

Name	Country	Event	Banned substance(s)	Reference(s)
Christos Iakovou	Greece	Weightlifting	Steroids	
Iryna Iarosh	Ukraine	Rowing	Numerous banned substances	
Jazmin Ibeth	Mexico	Weightlifting		
Sarmadm Idrees	Iraq	Weightlifting	Metandienone	
Fernando Iglesias	Argentina	Wrestling	Clenbuterol, Furosemide	
Glenn Ikonen	Sweden	Wheelchair curling		
Babak Imcheh	Iran	Wrestling	Norandrosterone	
Janne Immonen	Finland	Cross-country skiing	HES	
Guto Inocente	Brazil	Kickboxing	Stanozolol, anastrozole, tamoxifen and THC	
In Sun Hong	North Korea	Diving	Furosemide	
Ekaterina Iourieva	Russia	Biathlon	r-EPO	
Muzaffar Iqbal Mirza	Pakistan	Boxing		
Yusaku Iriki	Japan	Baseball	Steroids	
Laurent Irish	United Kingdom	Basketball	Cannabis	
James Irvin	United States	Mixed martial arts	Methadone and oxymorphone	
Michael Irvin	United States	American football	Cocaine	
Bala Isa	Albania	Weightlifting		
Anzur Ismailov	Uzbekistan	Football (soccer)	Cannabis	
Gunduz Ismayilov	Azerbaijan	Powerlifting	Stanozolol	
Jari Isometsä	Finland	Cross-country skiing	HES	
Mark Iuliano	Italy	Football (soccer)	Cocaine	
Dobri Ivanov	Bulgaria	Wrestling	Methandienone, Clenbuterol	
Anastasia Ivanenko	Russia	Swimming	Furosemide	
Ivan Ivanov	Bulgaria	Weightlifting	Furosemide	
Ksenia Ivlieva	Russia	Swimming	Furosemide	
McKnee Ivorn	Barbados	Weightlifting	T/E 9,6	
Ince Izzet	Turkey	Weightlifting	Methandienone	
