= List of doping cases in sport (D) =

This is a sub-list from List of doping cases in sport representing a full list of surnames starting with D.

Name	Country	Event	Banned substance(s)	Reference(s)
Omar Daaboul	Lebanon	Swimming	Methandienone, Methyltestosterone, Norandrosterone	
Phongsathon Daengsanan	Thailand	Weightlifting	Metandienone	
Peter Daija	Canada	Shot put		
Haider Dakhil	Iraq	Weightlifting		
Marius Danciu	Romania	Weightlifting	Methandienone	
Dang Zhiyong	China	Bodybuilding		
Ashot Danielyan	Armenia	Weightlifting	Steroids	
Olga Danilova	Russia	Cross-country skiing	NESP	
Kofi Danso	United Kingdom	Basketball	Cannabis, test tampering	
Joey D'Antoni	United States	Cycling	Erythropoietin (EPO)	
Yerbolat Darivkhan	Mongolia	Weightlifting	Metandienone	
Obiero David	Kenya	Weightlifting		
Dimitrii Davidenco	Moldova	Weightlifting	Stanozolol	
Edgar Davids	Netherlands	Football (soccer)	Nandrolone	
Ceri Davies	United Kingdom	Rugby	Drostanolone	
Chris Davis	United States	Baseball	Amphetamines	
Zviad Davitiani	France	Water polo	Cocaine	
Mohsen Davoodi	Iran	Weightlifting	Metandienone	
Alina Davydchenko	Ukraine	Weightlifting	Methyltestosterone	
Deco	Portugal	Football (soccer)	Furosemide	
Michael de Angelis	Italy	Ice hockey	Ephedrine	
Frank de Boer	Netherlands	Football (soccer)	Nandrolone	
Samuel de Bona	Brazil	Swimming	Methylhexaneamine	
Francesco De Bonis	Italy	Cycling		
Rusmin Dedić	Slovenia	Football (soccer)	Testosterone	
Gervasio Deferr	Spain	Gymnastics	Cannabis	
Thomas Dekker	Netherlands	Cycling	EPO	
Efrain de la Rosa	Dominican Republic	Weightlifting	Stanozolol, Hydroxystanozolol	
Flávia Delaroli	Brazil	Swimming	Tuaminoheptane	
Vilimoni Delasau	Fiji	Rugby union	Cannabis	
Carlo Del Fava	Italy	Rugby		
Bernardo de Figueiredo	Brazil	Swimming	Methylhexaneamine	
Fautino de los Santos	Dominican Republic	Baseball	Performance-enhancing drugs	
Luca De Matteis	Italy	Swimming	Tuaminoheptane	
Jacques Demers	Canada	Weightlifting	Steroids	
Maria Demertzi	Greece	Swimming	Testosterone	
Vasileios Demetis	Greece	Swimming	Caffeine	
Demir Demirev	Bulgaria	Weightlifting	Steroids	
Vincent de Nardi	France	Water polo	Cannabis	
Daynara de Paula	Brazil	Swimming	Furosemide	
João Derly	Brazil	Judo	Diuretics	
Cristoforos Dermitzakis	Greece	Water polo	Pseudoephedrine	
Kasun De Silva	Sri Lanka	Rugby union	cannabis	
Pamela Alencar de Souza	Brazil	Swimming	Methylhexaneamine	
Serge Despres	Canada	Bobsledding	Nandrolone	
Frankie Dettori	Ireland	Horse racing	Cocaine	
Lindsay Devaney	United States	Swimming	Refusal to submit to doping test	
Kavita Devi	India	Weightlifting		
Kunjarani Devi	India	Weightlifting	Strychnine	
Monika Devi	India	Weightlifting		
Sukhen Dey	India	Weightlifting	Methylhexaneamine	
Nick Diaz	United States	Mixed martial arts	cannabis	
Mark Dickel	New Zealand	Basketball	Cannabis	
Niroshan Dickwella	Sri Lanka	Cricket	Cocaine	
Aurimas Didžbalis	Lithuania	Weightlifting	Dehydrochlormethyltestosterone	
Ludo Dierckxsens	Belgium	Cycling	Cortisone	
Roland Diethart	Austria	Cross-country skiing	Violation of blood doping rules	
Robert Dietrich	Germany	Ice hockey	Missed test	
Ben Dietvorst	Belgium	Water polo	Cannabis	
Bert Dietz	Germany	Cycling	Erythropoietin (EPO) (self-admitted)	
Arthur Dilman	Kazakhstan	Swimming	Furosemide	
Eva Maria Dimas	El Salvador	Weightlifting	Nandrolone	
Vasilka Dineva	Bulgaria	Weightlifting	Metandienone	
Ding Haifeng	China	Weightlifting		
Danilo Di Luca	Italy	Cycling	EPO	
Nuria Diosdado	Mexico	Swimming	Clenbuterol	
Simon Pietro Di Santos	Italy	Swimming	Cannabis	
Estera Dobre	Romania	Wrestling	Furosemide	
Tony Dodson	United Kingdom	Boxing		
Harun Doğan	Turkey	Wrestling	Metenolone, Ephedrine	
Jerramie Domish	United States	Ice hockey		
Isabell Donath	Germany	Swimming	Missed test	
Armando dos Santos	Brazil	Bobsledding	Nandrolone	
John Donnelly	United Kingdom	Boxing	Benzoylecgonine	
Sabina Dostalova	Czech Republic	Swimming	Methandienone	
Juan Pablo Dotti	Argentina	Cycling	Amphetamines	
Matej Douda	Czech Republic	Volleyball	Cannabinoids	
Mikhail Dovgalyuk	Russia	Swimming		
Izabela Dragneva	Bulgaria	Weightlifting	Furosemide	
Alban Dragusha	Albania	Football (soccer)	Nandrolone	
Nicolas Dran	France	Volleyball	Cocaine	
John Drew	United States	Basketball	Cocaine	
Volha Dryla	Belarus	Weightlifting	Stanozolol	
Ioannis Drymonakos	Greece	Swimming	Methyltrienolone	
Mariia Dudina	Russia	Handball	meldonium	
Laurent Dufaux	Switzerland	Cycling	Erythropoietin (EPO)	
Christophe Dugarry	France	Football (soccer)	Nandrolone	
Richard Dumas	United States	Basketball		
Matt Dumontelle	Canada	Curling	Methandienone	
Terry Dunstan	United Kingdom	Boxing		
Antony Dupuis	France	Tennis	Salbutamol	
Jamie Durbin	United Kingdom	Rugby League	Stanozolol	
Leon Durham	United States	Baseball		
Maria Duvakina	Russia	Handball	meldonium	
Johannes Dürr	Austria	Cross-country skiing	Erythropoietin	
Myroslav Dykun	United Kingdom	Wrestling	Methamphetamine	
Gamlet Dzhioyev	Russia	Wrestling		
Alexander Dzyuba	Kazakhstan	Weightlifting	Stanozolol	
