= List of doping cases in sport (W) =

This is a sub-list from List of doping cases in sport representing a full list of surnames starting with W.

Name	Country	Event	Banned substance(s)	Reference(s)
Graham Wagg	England	Cricket	Cocaine	
Wakakirin Shinichi	Japan	Sumo wrestling	Cannabis	
Wakanohō Toshinori	Russia	Sumo wrestling	Cannabis	
Vinicius Waked	Brazil	Swimming	Furosemide	
Achim Walcher	Austria	Cross-country skiing	Blood transfusion	
Alexander Walke	Germany	Football (soccer)	cannabis	
Libor Walzer	Czech Republic	Weightlifting	Methylhexanamine	
Wang Hongni	China	Triathlon		
Wang Luna	China	Swimming	Triamterene	
Wang Wei	China	Swimming	Clenbuterol	
Wang Xiapeng	China	Shooting		
Wang Yan	China	Cycling		
Manju Wanniarachchi	Sri Lanka	Boxing	Nandrolone	
Shane Warne	Australia	Cricket	Diuretics	
Joe Warren	United States	Wrestling	Cannabis	
Jack Warrington	England	Rugby union	Methylhexaneamine	
Chris Washburn	United States	Basketball	Cocaine	
Claudell Washington	United States	Baseball	Cocaine	
Duane Washington	United States	Basketball	Cocaine	
Alex Watson	Australia	Pentathlon	Caffeine	
Eric Watts	United States	Swimming	Methylphenidate	
Logan Webb	United States	Baseball	Dehydrochlormethyltestosterone	
Jon Weber	United States	Baseball	Ephedrine, drug of abuse	
Wei Kun	China	Swimming	Formoterol	
Wes Welker	United States	American football	Amphetamine (MDMA)	
Anthony West	Australia	Motorcycle racing	Methylhexanamine	
Stig Wetzell	Finland	Ice hockey	Ephedrine	Stig Wetzell#1974 Doping Controversy
Matt White	Australia	Cycling		
Matt Whiteside	United States	Baseball	Steroids	
Dillian Whyte	United Kingdom	Boxing	Methylhexaneamine	
Yanina Wickmayer	Belgium	Tennis	Missed test	
Alan Wiggins	United States	Baseball	Cocaine	
Mitchell Wiggins	United States	Basketball	Cocaine	
LB Wijeratne	Sri Lanka	Swimming	Prednisone, Prednisolone	
Mats Wilander	Sweden	Tennis	Cocaine	
Michał Wilk	Poland	Powerlifting		(in Norwegian)
Rob Wilkinson	Australia	Mixed martial arts (MMA)		
Ricky Williams	United States	American football	Cannabis, other drugs	
Craig Windsor	United Kingdom	Boxing	Anabolic steroids	
Bernice Wilson	United Kingdom	Track and field athletics	Anabolic steroid testosterone and Clenbuterol (1st offence in 2011), clomiphene (2nd offence in 2015)	
George Winston	United Kingdom	Weightlifting	Anabolic steroids	
Qyntel Woods	United States	Basketball	Indian cannabis	(in Greek)
Jesper Worre	Denmark	Cycling	Amineptine	
Chris Wright	England	Cricket	Ostarine	(in Greek)
Steven Wright	United States	Baseball	GHRP-2	
Dan Wu	China	Weightlifting		
Wu Yanyan	China	Swimming		
