= List of doping cases in sport (U) =

This is a sub-list from List of doping cases in sport representing a full list of surnames starting with U.

Name	Country	Event	Banned substance(s)	Reference(s)
Genco Ucan	Turkey	Swimming	Metenolone	
Luis Ugueto	Venezuela	Baseball	Performance-enhancing drugs	
Aleksa Ukropina	Montenegro	Waterpolo	Fenoterol	
Attila Ungvari	Hungary	Judo	Stanozolol	
Sergey Ulegin	Russia	Canoe sprint	Amphetamine	
Jan Ullrich	Germany	Cycling	Amphetamine	
Kumar Umang	India	Volleyball	Norandrostenedione	
Paritosh Upadhyay	India	Weightlifting		
Juan Guillermo Uran	Colombia	Swimming	Cocaine	
Lino Urdaneta	Venezuela	Baseball	Performance-enhancing substance	
Alexander Urinov	Uzbekistan	Weightlifting	cannabis	
Giampaolo Urlando	Italy	Hammer throw	Testosterone	
Mukhit Usenbaev	Kazakhstan	Weightlifting		
Alisa Usmanova	Belarus	Gymnastics	Hydrochlorothiazide	
Dariya Ustinova	Russia	Swimming	Tuaminoheptane	
Albeiro Usuriaga	Colombia	Football (soccer)	Cocaine	
