= List of doping cases in sport (Z) =

This is a sub-list from List of doping cases in sport representing a full list of surnames starting with Z.

Name	Country	Event	Banned substance(s)	Reference(s)
Erik Zabel	Germany	Cycling	Erythropoietin (EPO) (self-admitted)	
Ashkan Sharaf Zadeh	Iran	Swimming	Methandienone	
Shoaib Zahoor	Pakistan	Bodybuilding		
Andrey Zakharov	Moldova	Swimming	Stanozolol	
Faat Zakirov	Russia	Cycling	NESP	
Aksana Zalatarova	Belarus	Weightlifting		
Tommaso Zambelli	Italy	Swimming	Cannabis	
Matthew Zammit	Malta	Swimming	Stanozolol	
Mohamad Zawit	Syria	Weightlifting	Stanozolol, Metenolone, Methyltestosterone	
Zeng Liqing	China	Cycling	Erythropoietin (EPO)	
Zhang Bin	China	Swimming		
Zhang Lei	China	Canoeing		
Zhang Shuai	China	Football (soccer)	Ephedrine	
Zhang Yi	China	Swimming	Triamterene	
Nina Zhivanevskaya	Russia	Swimming	Bromantane	
Zhou Guanbin	China	Swimming		
Zhou Jie	China	Swimming		
Zhou Mi	Hong Kong	Badminton	Clenbuterol	
Anastasia Ziablova	Russia	Swimming	Nandrolone	
Spencer Zimmerman-Cryer	Canada	Canadian football	Oral-Turinabol	
Paula Zukowska	Poland	Swimming	Methylhexaneamine	
Alex Zülle	Switzerland	Cycling	Erythropoietin (EPO)	
Zuo Ziqiao	China	Swimming	Clenbuterol	
Arthur Zwane	South Africa	Football (soccer)	Methyltestosterone	
Tara Zwink	United States	Snowboarding	cannabis	
