= List of doping cases in sport (J) =

This is a sub-list from List of doping cases in sport representing a full list of surnames starting with J.

Name	Country	Event	Banned substance(s)	Reference(s)
Shayna Jack	Australia	Swimming	Ligandrol	
Mette Jacobsen	Denmark	Swimming	Prednisolone, Prednisone	
Mahmoud Jadaan	Syria	Swimming	Metenolone	
Jörg Jaksche	Germany	Cycling	Erythropoietin (EPO)	
Laurent Jalabert	France	Cycling	Erythropoietin (EPO)	
Jiraporn Janchum	Thailand	Weightlifting	Methandienone	
Paulo Bruno Janeiro	Brazil	Swimming	Cannabis	
Michal Jarczak	Poland	Gymnastics	THC	
Daniel Jardemyr	Sweden	Ice hockey	Amphetamine	
Sabri Jari	Tunisia	Swimming	Refusal to submit to doping test	
Omar Jasika	Australia	Tennis	Cocaine	
Mohammed Jassim	Iraq	Weightlifting	Cortisone	
Ernst Jean-Joseph	Haiti	Football (soccer)	Phenmetrazine	
Leon Jeanne	Wales	Football (soccer)		
Genevieve Jeanson	Canada	Cycling	Erythropoietin (EPO)	
Brian Dalgaard Jensen	Denmark	Cycling	Erythropoietin (EPO)	
Knud Enemark Jensen	Denmark	Cycling	Amphetamines	
Aubrey Jesseau	Canada	Canadian football	Stanozolol	
Tomas Johansson	Sweden	Sport wrestling	Anabolic steroids	
Therese Johaug	Norway	Cross-country skiing	Anabolic steroid Clostebol	
Ben Johnson	Canada	Sprinting	Stanozolol	
Eddie Johnson	United States	Basketball	Cocaine	
Gea Johnson	United States	Athletics (Hept)	Anabolic steroids	
Gea Johnson	United States	Weightlifting	Epitestosterone	
Gea Johnson	United States	Cycling	Modafinil	
Willie Johnston	Scotland	Football (soccer)	Reactivan	
Harrison Jones	United States	Diving	Cannabis	
JaCoby Jones	United States	Baseball	Non-performance-enhancing drugs	
Roy Jones Jr.	United States	Boxing	Androstenedione (Banned substance by the IBF but available legally over-the-counter in the US at time of use)	
Ahmad Joughili	Syria	Weightlifting	Metandienone	
Alberto Jose	Dominican Republic	Weightlifting	Methandienone, Dehydrochlormethyltestosterone	
Mi Naw Ju	Myanmar	Weightlifting		
Rui Jorge	Portugal	Association football	Budesonide (ban lifted due to Sporting CP's failure to notify authorities of his medical exemption)	
Miguel Juarez	Venezuela	Swimming	Nandrolone	
Olivera Juric	Bosnia and Herzegovina	Weightlifting	Metandienone	
Ladislav Jusko	Czech Republic	Water polo	Cannabis	
