= List of doping cases in sport (Q) =

This is a sub-list from List of doping cases in sport representing a full list of surnames starting with Q.

Name	Country	Event	Banned substance(s)	Reference(s)
Erkand Qerimaj	Albania	Weightlifting	Methylhexaneamine	
Qiu Suoren	China	Canoeing		
Qiu Xiexion	China	Weightlifting		
Qu Jing	China	Swimming	Clenbuterol	
Quim	Portugal	Football (soccer)	Nandrolone	
Mohammad Imran Qureshi	Pakistan	Bodybuilding	Nandrolone	
