= List of doping cases in sport (X) =

This is a sub-list from List of doping cases in sport representing a full list of surnames starting with X.

Name	Country	Event	Banned substance(s)	Reference(s)
Abel Xavier	Portugal	Football (soccer)	Methandienone (Dianabol)	
Xiong Guoming	China	Swimming	Clenbuterol	
