= Derlis Gómez =

Paraguayan footballer (born 1972)

Personal information
- Full name: Derlis Venancio Gómez López
- Date of birth: 2 November 1972 (age 53)
- Place of birth: Ypacaraí, Paraguay
- Height: 1.86 m (6 ft 1 in)
- Position: Goalkeeper

Senior career*
Years	Team	Apps	(Gls)
1991–1996	Sol de América Asunción		
1997–2000	Club Guaraní		
2001	Libertad	20	(0)
2002–2006	Sportivo Luqueño	117	(0)
2003	→ 12 de Octubre (loan)	27	(0)
2006–2007	Quilmes	7	(0)
2007–2009	Nacional Asunción	77	(0)
2011	Independiente FBC	43	(0)
2012	3 de Febrero	14	(0)
2013–2014	12 de Octubre		

International career
1999–2006	Paraguay	6	(0)
- * Club domestic league appearances and goals

Derlis Venancio Gómez López (born 2 November 1972) is a retired Paraguayan footballer who played as a goalkeeper.

== Career ==
Gómez played club football for Club Sol de América, Club Guaraní, Club 12 de Octubre, Sportivo Luqueño, Club Olimpia, Club Libertad and Club Nacional in Paraguay and Quilmes Atlético Club in Argentina.

Gómez was also part of the Paraguay national team. He was named in his country's squad for the 2006 FIFA World Cup in Germany, though he did not start for the team.

In April 2003, Gómez was banned from playing in CONMEBOL-organized competitions for 6 months following a positive doping test.

== See also ==
- List of doping cases in sport
