= List of doping cases in sport (Y) =

This is a sub-list from List of doping cases in sport representing a full list of surnames starting with Y.

Name	Country	Event	Banned substance(s)	Reference(s)
Manal Yagoubi	Algeria	Volleyball	Methylprednisolone	
Yang Aihua	China	Swimming		
Dmitri Yaroshenko	Russia	Biathlon	r-EPO	
Yang Xuewei	China	Weightlifting		
Dayana Yastremska	Ukraine	Tennis	Mesterolone	
Jeremy Yates	New Zealand	Cycling	Testosterone	
Faw Thaw Ye	Myanmar	Weightlifting		
Yuliya Yefimova	Russia	Swimming	Dehydroepiandrosterone	
Yevgenia Yermakova	Kazakhstan	Swimming	Diuretic	(in German)
Vacheslav Yershov	Kazakhstan	Weightlifting		
Ying Shang	China	Swimming	Clenbuterol	
Yuki Yokosawa	Japan	Judo		
Floyd Youmans	United States	Baseball	Cocaine (self-admitted)	
Marshall Young	Canada	Water polo	Cannabis	
