= Androgen (medication) =

Androgen (medication) may refer to:

- Testosterone (medication)
- Androgen replacement therapy
- Anabolic steroid

== See also ==
- Androgen
