= List of doping cases in sport =

The following is an incomplete list of sportspeople who have been involved in doping offences. It contains those who have been found to have, or have admitted to having, taken illegal performance-enhancing drugs, prohibited recreational drugs or have been suspended by a sports governing body for failure to submit to mandatory drug testing.

- List of doping cases in sport (A)
- List of doping cases in sport (B)
- List of doping cases in sport (C)
- List of doping cases in sport (D)
- List of doping cases in sport (E)
- List of doping cases in sport (F)
- List of doping cases in sport (G)
- List of doping cases in sport (H)
- List of doping cases in sport (I)
- List of doping cases in sport (J)
- List of doping cases in sport (K)
- List of doping cases in sport (L)
- List of doping cases in sport (M)
- List of doping cases in sport (N)
- List of doping cases in sport (O)
- List of doping cases in sport (P)
- List of doping cases in sport (Q)
- List of doping cases in sport (R)
- List of doping cases in sport (S)
- List of doping cases in sport (T)
- List of doping cases in sport (U)
- List of doping cases in sport (V)
- List of doping cases in sport (W)
- List of doping cases in sport (X)
- List of doping cases in sport (Y)
- List of doping cases in sport (Z)

== Horses ==
Horse	Rider	Country	Banned substance(s)	Reference(s)
ABC Landliebe	Florent Gilbert	Ireland	Fluphenazine, Guanabenz	
Camiro	Tony André Hansen	Norway	Capsaicin	
Castle Forbes Maike	Jessica Kurten	Ireland	Etoricoxib	
Chupa Chup	Bernardo Alves	Brazil	Nonivamide	
Coster	Christian Ahlmann	Germany	Capsaicin	
Goldfever	Ludger Beerbaum	Germany	Cortisone	
Lantinus	Denis Lynch	Ireland	Capsaicin	
Ooh Aah Camara	Franny Norton	Ireland	Phenylbutazone, Oxyphenbutazone	
Waterford Crystal	Cian O'Connor	Ireland	Fluphenazine, Zuclopenthixol	

== See also ==
- List of doping cases in sport by substance
- List of doping cases in athletics
- List of doping cases in cycling
- List of Major League Baseball players suspended for steroids
- List of Major League Baseball players named in the Mitchell Report — notes players who have admitted, denied, and refused to comment on accusations of performance-enhancing drug use
- Category:Sportspeople in doping cases by nationality
- List of professional sportspeople convicted of crimes
- Pittsburgh drug trials
- Technology doping
- Doping at the Asian Games
- Doping at the Olympics
