= Blood doping =

Boosting the number of red blood cells in the bloodstream

Blood doping is a form of doping in which the number of red blood cells in the bloodstream is boosted in order to enhance athletic performance. Because such blood cells carry oxygen from the lungs to the muscles, a higher concentration in the blood can improve an athlete's aerobic capacity (VO_{2} max) and endurance. Blood doping can be achieved by making the body produce more red blood cells itself using drugs, giving blood transfusions either from another person or back to the same individual, or by using blood substitutes.

Many methods of blood doping are illegal, particularly in professional sports where it is considered to give an artificial advantage to the competitor. Anti-doping agencies use tests to try to identify individuals who have been blood doping using a number of methods, typically by analyzing blood samples from the competitors.

== Description ==
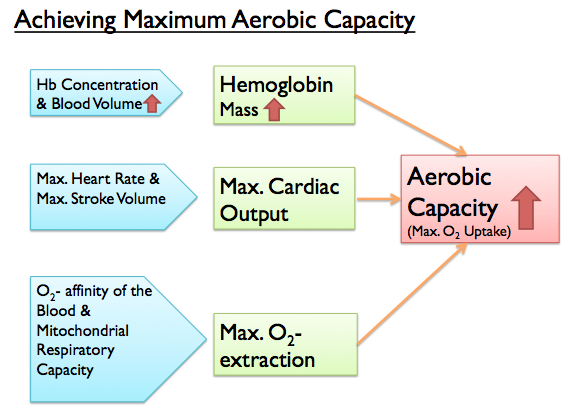
Fig. 1 Achieving maximum aerobic capacity

Blood doping is defined as the use of illicit products (e.g. erythropoietin (EPO), darbepoetin-alfa, hypoxia-inducible factor (HIF) stabilizers) and methods (e.g. increase aerobic capacity by maximizing the uptake of O_{2}) in order to enhance the O_{2} transport of the body to the muscles.

The body undergoes aerobic respiration in order to provide sufficient delivery of O_{2} to the exercising skeletal muscles and the main determining factors are shown in figure 1. The rate of maximum O_{2} uptake (O_{2}max) depends on cardiac output, O_{2} extraction and hemoglobin mass. The cardiac output of an athlete is difficult to manipulate during competitions and the distribution of cardiac output is at the maximum rate (i.e. 80%) during competitions. In addition, the O_{2} extraction is approximately 90% at maximal exercise. Therefore, the only method to enhance the physical performance left is to increase the O_{2} content in the artery by enhancing the hemoglobin mass. In other words, hemoglobin concentration and blood volume contribute to hemoglobin mass.

== Methods ==
=== Drug treatments ===
Many forms of blood doping stem from the misuse of pharmaceuticals. These drug treatments have been created for clinical use to increase the oxygen delivery when the human body is not able to do so naturally.

==== Erythropoietin ====
Erythropoietin (EPO) is a glycoprotein hormone produced by the interstitial fibroblasts in the kidney that signal for erythropoiesis in bone marrow. The increased activity of a hemocytoblast (RBC stem cell) allows the blood to have a greater carrying capacity for oxygen. EPO was first developed to counteract the effects of chemotherapy and radiation therapy for cancer patients. EPO also stimulates increased wound healing. Because of its physiological side effects, particularly increased hematocrit, EPO has become a drug with abuse potential by professional and amateur cyclists.

==== Hypoxia-inducible factor (HIF) stabilizer ====
Hypoxia-inducible factor stabilizer (HIF stabilizer) is a pharmaceutical used to treat chronic kidney disease. Like most transcription factors, the HIF transcription factor is responsible for the expression of a protein. The HIF stabilizer activates the activity of EPO due to anemia-induced hypoxia, metabolic stress, and vasculogenesis (the creation of new blood vessels). HIF stabilizers as used by cyclists in combination with cobalt chloride/desferrioxamine to stimulate and de-regulate the natural production of erythropoietin hormone. At physiologically low PaO_{2} around 40 mmHg, EPO is released from the kidneys to increase hemoglobin transportation. The combination of drugs consistently releases EPO due to increased transcription at the cellular level. The effect wears off when the HIF stabilizers, cobalt chloride/desferrioxamine is excreted and/or decayed by the body.

==== Myo-inositol trispyrophosphate (ITPP) ====
Myo-inositol trispyrophosphate (ITPP), also known as compound number OXY111A, is an allosteric effector of hemoglobin which causes a rightward shift in the oxygen–hemoglobin dissociation curve, increasing the amount of oxygen released from red blood cells into surrounding tissue during each passage through the cardiovascular system. ITPP has been a subject of anti-doping research in both humans and racehorses.

=== Blood transfusion ===
Blood transfusions can be traditionally classified as autologous, where the blood donor and transfusion recipient are the same, or as allogeneic/homologous, where the blood is transfused into someone other than the donor. Blood transfusion begins by the withdrawal of 1 to 4 units of blood (1 unit = 450 mL of blood) several weeks before competition. The blood is centrifuged, the plasma components are immediately reinfused, and the corpuscular elements, principally red blood cells (RBCs), are stored refrigerated at 4 °C or frozen at −80 °C. As blood stored by refrigeration displays a steady decline in the number of RBCs, a substantial percentage, up to 40%, of the stored RBCs may not be viable. The freezing process, conversely, limits the aging of the cells, allowing the storage of the blood for up to 10 years with a 10% to 15% loss of RBCs.

=== Blood substitutes ===
Biochemical and biotechnological development has allowed novel approaches to this issue, in the form of engineered O_{2} carriers, widely known as "blood substitutes". The blood substitutes currently available are chiefly polymerized haemoglobin solutions or haemoglobin-based oxygen carriers (HBOCs) and perfluorocarbons (PFCs).

==== Hemoglobin-based oxygen carriers (HBOCs) ====
Hemoglobin-based oxygen carriers are intra/ inter-molecularly engineered human or animal hemoglobins, only optimized for oxygen delivery and longer intravascular circulation. The presence of 2,3-diphosphoglycerate within erythrocytes maintains the normal affinity of hemoglobin for oxygen. HBOCs do not contain erythrocytes and lose this interaction, thus, unmodified human HBOC solutions have a very high oxygen affinity which compromises their function. Chemical methods developed to overcome this problem have resulted in carriers that effectively release oxygen at the physiological pO_{2} of peripheral tissues.

A common feature of all HBOCs is their resistance to dissociate when dissolved in media, which contrasts hemoglobin of natural dissociation under non-physiological conditions. HBOCs may hypothetically supply greater benefits to athletes than those provided by the equivalent hemoglobin in traditional RBC infusion. Recent developments have shown that HBOCs are not only simple RBC substitutes, but highly effective O_{2} donors in terms of tissue oxygenation. Additional effects include increases in blood serum iron, ferritin, and Epo; up to 20% increased diffusion of oxygen and improved exercise capacity; increased CO_{2} production; and lower lactic acid generation in anaerobic activity. HBOCs have been shown in trials to be extremely dangerous in humans. Because HBOCs increase both the risk of death and risk of myocardial infarction clinical trials were ended. They are not commercially available in the US or Europe and there is no approved use for them.

==== Perfluorocarbons (PFCs) ====
PFCs, also known as fluorocarbons, are inert, water-insoluble, synthetic compounds, consisting primarily of carbon and fluorine atoms bonded together in strong C–F bonds. PFCs are substantially clear and colorless liquid emulsions that are heterogeneous in molecular weight, surface area, electronic charge, and viscosity; their high content of electron-dense fluorine atoms results in little intramolecular interaction and low surface tension, making such substances excellent solvents for gases, especially oxygen and carbon dioxide. Some of these molecules can dissolve 100 times more oxygen than plasma. PFCs are naturally hydrophobic and need to be emulsified to be injected intravenously. Since PFCs dissolve rather than bind oxygen, their capacity to serve as a blood substitute is determined principally by the pO_{2} gradients in the lung and at the target tissue. Therefore, their oxygen transport properties differ substantially from those of whole blood and, especially, from those of RBCs. At a conventional ambient pO_{2} of 135 mmHg, the oxygen content of 900 mL/L perfluorocarbon is less than 50 mL/L, whereas an optimal oxygen content of 160 mL/L, which is still lower than that of whole blood in normal conditions, can be achieved only by a pO_{2} greater than 500 mmHg. In practice, at a conventional alveolar pO_{2} of 135 mmHg, PFCs will not be able to provide sufficient oxygenation to peripheral tissues.

Due to their small size, PFCs are able to permeate circulation where erythrocytes may not flow. In tiny capillaries, PFCs produce the greatest benefit, as they increase local oxygen delivery much more efficiently than would be expected from the increase in oxygen content in larger arteries. In addition, as gases are in the dissolved state within PFCs, it pO_{2} promotes efficient oxygen delivery to peripheral tissues. Since the mid-1980s, improvements in both oxygen capacity and emulsion properties of PFCs have led to the development of second-generation PFC-based oxygen carriers; two PFC products are currently being tested in phase III clinical trials.

=== Cobalt chloride administration ===
Transition metal complexes are widely known to play important roles in erythropoiesis; as such, inorganic supplementation is proving to be an emerging technique in blood doping. Particularly of note is the cobalt complex, cobalamin (Vitamin B_{12}) commonly used as a dietary supplement. Cobalamin is an important complex used in the manufacture of red blood cells and thus was of interest for potential use in blood doping. Experimental evidence, however, has shown that cobalamin has no effect on erythropoiesis in the absence of a red blood cell/oxygen deficiency. These results seem to confirm much of what is already known about the functioning of cobalamin. The signaling pathway that induces erythropoietin secretion and subsequently red blood cell manufacture using cobalamin is O_{2} dependent. Erythropoietin is only secreted in the kidneys when there is an O_{2} deficiency, as such, RBC manufacture is independent of the amount of cobalamin administered when there is no O_{2} deficiency. Accordingly, cobalamin is of little to no value in blood doping.

More potent for use in blood doping is Co^{2+} (administered as Cobalt(II) chloride, CoCl_{2}). Cobalt chloride has been known to be useful in treating anemic patients. Recent experimental evidence has proved the efficacy of cobalt chloride in blood doping. Studies into the action of this species have shown that Co^{2+} induces hypoxia like responses, the most relevant response being erythropoiesis. Co^{2+} induces this response by binding to the N-terminus (loop helix loop domain) of the hypoxia-inducible transcription factors HIF-1α and HIF-2α, and thus stabilizes these protein complexes. Under normal O_{2} conditions, HIFs are destabilized as proline and asparagine residues are hydroxylated by HIF-α hydroxylases, these unstable HIFs are subsequently degraded following a ubiquitin-proteosome pathway, as such, they cannot then bind and activate transcription of genes encoding Erythropoietin (EPO). With Co^{2+} stabilization, degradation is prevented and genes encoding EPO can then be activated. The mechanism for this Co^{2+} N terminus stabilization is not yet fully understood. In addition to N-terminus binding, it has also been hypothesized that replacement of Fe^{2+} by Co^{2+} in the hydroxylase active site could be a contributing factor to the stabilizing action of Co^{2+}. It is understood however, is that Co^{2+} binding permits Ubiquitin binding but prevents proteasomal degradation.

== Detection of blood doping ==
=== Detection for homologous blood doping ===
In 2004, a test for detection allogeneic/homologous blood transfusion doping was implemented. Flow cytometry is the method of choice. By examining markers on the surface of blood cells, the method can determine whether blood from more than one person is present in an athlete's circulation. The test utilizes 12 antisera directed against the blood group antigens, obtained from donor plasma. The antigens are labeled with secondary antibodies, which are conjugated with phycoerythrin to label IgG or IgM-coated RBCs and enhance the detection by flow cytometry The flow cytometry is able to detect minor variance in blood group antigens. The assessment was able to distinguish the blood of subjects who had earlier received at least one unit of allogeneic blood. This technique is able to detect small (<5%) populations of cells that are antigenically distinct from an individual's own RBCs.

=== Detection for autologous blood doping ===
Autologous blood doping detection is done indirectly via CO rebreathing technique to measure the nonphysiologic increases in Hb mass. The principle of CO rebreathing method used currently requires an O_{2}-CO gas mixture inhalation for about 10-15mins. By measuring the difference in carboxyhemoglobin concentration (HbCO) before and after rebreathing, the volume of CO and the binding capacity of Hb for CO ( 1.39ml g-1), total Hb mass can be calculated. This detection method is problematic for an athlete as it is not desirable to breathe in CO shortly before a competition, which may potentially affect their performances.

=== Detection of blood hemoglobin-based oxygen carrier ===
Detection method for hemoglobin-based oxygen carriers (i.e. Oxyglobulin) is done in four separate steps. Step one involves the elimination of abundance proteins in the blood samples by immunodepletion (i.e. Proteo Prep 20 plasma immunodepletion kit). This process ensures that other proteins (i.e. albumin and immunoglobulin) do not interfere with capillary electrophoresis (CE) separation by changing the ionization. Second step, CE separation is done under certain condition, in this case background electrolyte consisting of ammonium formate (75mM at pH 9.5) in order to provide sufficient resolution between HBOC and Hb. Third step, UV/Vis detection was performed at 415 nm to selectively detect HBOC and HB. Fourth step, time-of-flight or mass spectrometer allowed increased accuracy in selectivity between hemoproteins and other proteins and definite determination of HBOC uptake. The detection limits for CE-UV/Vis at 415 nm and CE-ESI-TOF/MS results to be 0.20 and 0.45g/dL for plasma respectively.

=== Detection of cobalt concentration by utilizing the biokinetic model ===
Cobalt can be detected by laboratory blood analysis if the intake amount is greater than 400 μg per day. As the whole blood concentration is greater than 1 μg/L and the urinary concentration is greater than 10 μg/L after at least 10 days of administration. The dose, which increases the red blood cell production to approximately 16%-21%, is about 68 mg Co per day for at least 10 days of oral administration. The predicted whole blood concentration of cobalt exceeds 200 μg/L two hours after the last intake and the average urine concentrations of cobalt exceed 3000 μg/L within 24 hours of intake. A study was carried out where 23 subjects were to take 900 μg per day in the form of CoCl_{2} for 10 days. The model predictions were then compared to the study. The result shows that the model prediction for blood and urine are between the median concentration of the male and female groups, which indicate the model predictions sufficiently represent the test population as a whole.

== Military use ==
As early as 1947, military research scientists were studying ways to increase fighter pilots' tolerance for hypoxia at high altitude. In one such study, red blood cells were transfused into ten males at the US Naval Research facility, resulting in increased oxygen capacity.

In 1993, U.S. special forces commanders at Fort Bragg started experimenting with blood doping, also known as blood loading. Special forces operators would provide two units of whole blood, from which red blood cells would be extracted, concentrated, and stored under cold temperatures. 24 hours before a mission or battle, a small amount of red blood cells would be infused back into the soldier. Military scientists believe that the procedure increases the soldiers' endurance and alertness because of the increase in the blood's capability to carry oxygen.

In 1998, the Australian Defence Forces approved this technique for the Special Air Service Regiment. Senior nutritionist at the Australian Defence Science and Technology Organisation Chris Forbes-Ewan is quoted as saying that, unlike in sport, "all's fair in love and war". "What we are trying to gain is an advantage over any potential adversary", Forbes-Ewan said. In this study, over 50 performance-enhancing drugs and techniques were rejected. The six that were approved are caffeine, ephedrine, energy drinks, modafinil, creatine, and blood-loading.

== Notable blood doping cases ==
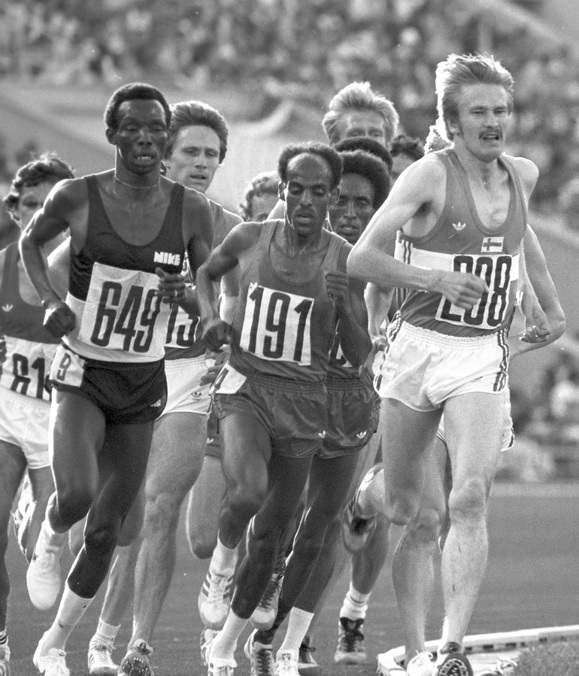
Kaarlo Maaninka (208), the subject of the first known blood doping case, in the 1980 Summer Olympics 5,000 m race.

Blood doping started in the late 1960s but was not outlawed until 1986. While it was still legal, it was commonly used by middle and long-distance runners. The first known case of blood doping occurred at the 1980 Summer Olympics in Moscow as Kaarlo Maaninka was transfused with two pints of blood before winning medals in the 5 and 10 kilometer track races, though this was not against the rules at the time. Cyclist Joop Zoetemelk admitted to receiving blood transfusions during the 1976 Tour de France, where he finished second, although he claimed that these were intended to treat his anaemia rather than enhance his performance. In the same year cyclist Francesco Moser used blood transfusions to prepare for his successful attempt to break the hour record. "Blood doping" was banned by the International Olympic Committee (IOC) in 1985, though no test existed for it at the time.

Cyclist Niklas Axelsson tested positive for EPO in 2000.

Cyclist Tyler Hamilton failed a fluorescent-activated cell sorting test for detecting homologous blood transfusions during the 2004 Olympics. He was allowed to keep his gold medal because the processing of his sample precluded conducting a second, confirmatory test. He appealed a second positive test for homologous transfusion from the 2004 Vuelta a España to the International Court of Arbitration for Sport but his appeal was denied. Hamilton's lawyers proposed Hamilton may be a genetic chimera or have had a 'vanishing twin' to explain the presence of red blood cells from more than one person. While theoretically possible, these explanations were ruled to be of "negligible probability".

Tour de France rider Alexander Vinokourov, of the Astana Team, tested positive for two different blood cell populations and thus for homologous transfusion, according to various news reports on July 24, 2007. Vinokourov was tested after his victory in the 13th stage time trial of the Tour on July 21, 2007. A doping test is not considered to be positive until a second sample is tested to confirm the first. Vinokourov's B sample has now tested positive, and he faces a possible suspension of two years and a fine equal to one year's salary. He also tested positive after stage 15.

Vinokourov's teammate Andrej Kashechkin also tested positive for homologous blood doping on August 1, 2007, just a few days after the conclusion of the 2007 Tour de France (a race that had been dominated by doping scandals). His team withdrew after the revelation that Vinokourov had doped.

According to Russian investigators, 19-year-old New York Rangers prospect and Russian hockey player Alexei Cherepanov was engaged in blood doping for several months before he died on October 13, 2008, after collapsing on the bench during a game in Russia. He also had myocarditis.

The German speed skater and five-fold Olympic gold medalist Claudia Pechstein was banned for two years in 2009 for alleged blood doping, based on irregular levels of reticulocytes in her blood and the assumption that these levels were always highest during competitions. Her mean reticulocyte count over the ten years from 2000 to 2009 was 2.1% during top events like Olympic Games and during world championships. At world cup races the mean reticulocyte was 1.9% and during training phases 2.0%. The Court of Arbitration for Sport confirmed the ban in November 2009 after her haematologist excluded the possibility of a blood disease.

In September 2010, the Swiss Federal Supreme Court rejected the athlete's appeal, stating that Pechstein's inherited blood anomaly had been known before.

On May 20, 2011, Tyler Hamilton turned in his 2004 Olympic Gold Medal to the U.S. Anti-Doping Agency after admitting to doping in a 60 Minutes interview.

On August 23, 2012, Lance Armstrong was stripped of his seven Tour de France titles and banned for life by cycling's governing body following a report from the U.S. Anti-Doping Agency that accused him of leading a doping program during his cycling career. He later admitted to using banned substances including blood doping with transfusions and EPO in an interview with Oprah Winfrey on January 17, 2013.

In June 2014, UFC fighter Chael Sonnen tested positive for EPO. One month later, another UFC fighter, Ali Bagautinov also tested positive for EPO.

In February 2018, Bahraini steeplechase and 3000 m steeplechase world record holder Ruth Jebet tested positive for EPO and on 4 March 2020, she was suspended for four years.

== Adverse effects ==
The simple act of increasing the number of red blood cells in blood may be associated with hyperviscosity syndrome which is characterized by increased blood viscosity and decreased cardiac output and blood flow velocity which results in the reduction of peripheral oxygen delivery. For instance, an overdose of EPO can thicken blood into a highly viscous and artery-clogging sludge. This increases the chances of heart attack, stroke, phlebitis, and pulmonary embolism, which has been seen in cases where there is too much blood reintroduced into the blood stream. Because blood doping increases the volume of red blood cells, it effectively introduces a condition called polycythemia, a blood disorder that has known adverse outcomes such as heart attacks or strokes.

Blood contamination during preparation or storage is another issue. Contamination was seen in 1 in every 500,000 transfusions of red blood cells in 2002. Blood contamination can lead to sepsis or an infection that affects the whole body.

Certain medications used to increase red blood cells can reduce liver function and lead to liver failure, pituitary problems, and increases in cholesterol levels.

== See also ==
- Use of performance-enhancing drugs in the Olympic Games
- Boosting (doping)
- Abortion doping
- Altitude training
