= Boldenone =

Chemical compound

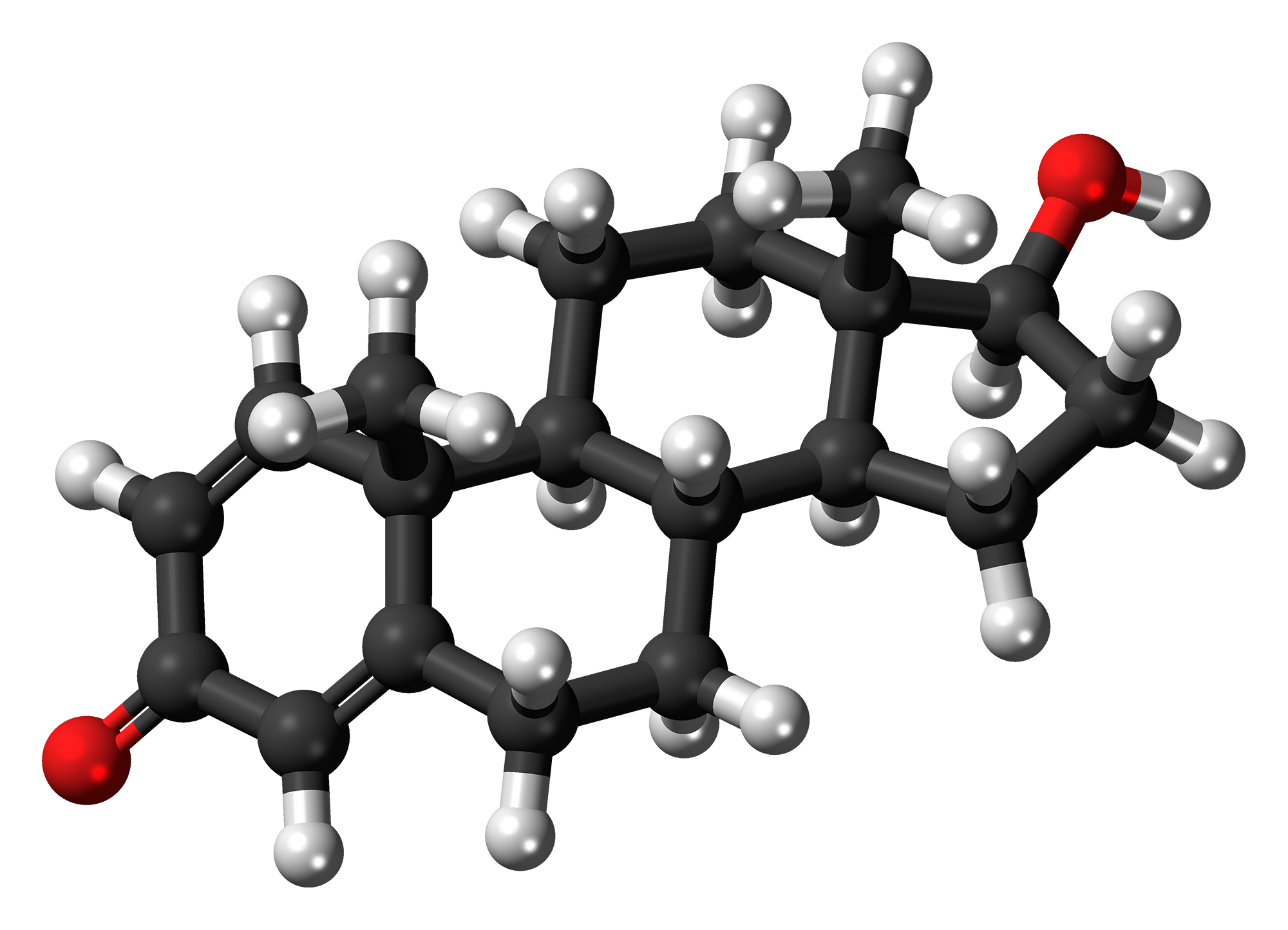

Clinical data
- Other names: Δ^{1}-Testosterone; 1-Dehydrotestosterone; RU-18761; Androsta-1,4-dien-17β-ol-3-one
- AHFS/Drugs.com: International Drug Names
- Pregnancy category: X (US) X (AUS)
- Routes of administration: Intramuscular injection
- Drug class: Androgen; Anabolic steroid
- ATC code: None

Legal status
- Legal status: BR: Class C5 (Anabolic steroids); CA: Schedule IV; UK: POM (Prescription only); US: Schedule III

Pharmacokinetic data
- Elimination half-life: Intramuscular: 14 days (as boldenone undecylenate)

Identifiers
- IUPAC name: (8R,9S,10R,13S,14S,17S)-17-Hydroxy-10,13-dimethyl-6,7,8,9,10,11,12,13,14,15,16,17-dodecahydro-3H-cyclopenta[a]phenanthren-3-one
- CAS Number: 846-48-0
- PubChem CID: 13308
- DrugBank: DB01541
- ChemSpider: 12744
- UNII: 5H7I2IP58X
- ChEBI: CHEBI:34584
- ChEMBL: ChEMBL2106059
- CompTox Dashboard (EPA): DTXSID20894201
- ECHA InfoCard: 100.011.533

Chemical and physical data
- Formula: C_{19}H_{26}O_{2}
- Molar mass: 286.415 g·mol^{−1}
- 3D model (JSmol): Interactive image
- Melting point: 165 °C (329 °F)
- SMILES: O=C\1\C=C/[C@]4(/C(=C/1)CC[C@@H]2[C@@H]4CC[C@@]3([C@@H](O)CC[C@@H]23)C)C
- InChI: InChI=1S/C19H26O2/c1-18-9-7-13(20)11-12(18)3-4-14-15-5-6-17(21)19(15,2)10-8-16(14)18/h7,9,11,14-17,21H,3-6,8,10H2,1-2H3/t14-,15-,16-,17-,18-,19-/m0/s1; Key:RSIHSRDYCUFFLA-DYKIIFRCSA-N

Boldenone (developmental code name RU-18761), is a naturally occurring anabolic–androgenic steroid (AAS) and the 1(2)-dehydrogenated analogue of testosterone. Boldenone itself has never been marketed; as a pharmaceutical drug, it is used as boldenone undecylenate, the undecylenate ester.

== Pharmacology ==
=== Pharmacodynamics ===
Like other AAS, boldenone is an agonist of the androgen receptor (AR). The activity of boldenone is mainly anabolic, with a low androgenic potency. Boldenone will increase nitrogen retention, protein synthesis, increases appetite and stimulates the release of erythropoietin in the kidneys.

== Chemistry ==
Boldenone, also known as Δ^{1}-testosterone, 1-dehydrotestosterone, or androsta-1,4-dien-17β-ol-3-one, is a naturally occurring androstane steroid and a derivative of testosterone. It is specifically testosterone with a double bond between the C1 and C2 positions. A related compound is quinbolone, the 17-cyclopentenyl enol ether of boldenone.

=== Sources ===
Boldenone occurs naturally in the scent gland of Ilybius fenestratus, a species of aquatic beetle.

In calves not fed boldenone, their urine 17α-boldenone content is strictly related to the phytosterol content of the diet. These naturally occurring amounts present are below doping attention limits.

== History ==
Ciba reportedly patented boldenone in 1949. It subsequently developed several experimental esters of the drug in the 1950s and 1960s. One of these was boldenone undecylenate, which was introduced for clinical use under the brand name Parenabol and saw some use in the late 1960s and early 1970s. However, it was discontinued before the end of the 1970s. Subsequently, boldenone undecylenate was introduced by Squibb under the brand name Equipose for veterinary use, most commonly in horses.

== Society and culture ==
=== Generic names ===
Boldenone is the generic name of the drug and its INN and BAN.

=== Brand names ===
Boldenone is marketed as veterinary drug as boldenone undecylenate (a derivative of boldenone) under the following brand names: Boldebal H, Equipoise, and Sybolin. It is marketed as a veterinary combination drug with methandriol under the brand name Drive.

In Ukraine, it is marketed for human consumption as the injectable steroid Boldenol.

=== Doping in sports ===
There are many known cases of doping in sports with boldenone undecylenate by professional athletes.
