= 19-Norandrosterone =

Chemical compound

Clinical data
- Other names: 3α-Hydroxy-5α-estran-17-one; 5α-Estran-3α-ol-17-one

Identifiers
- IUPAC name: (3R,5S,8R,9R,10S,13S,14S)-3-Hydroxy-13-methyl-2,3,4,5,6,7,8,9,10,11,12,14,15,16-tetradecahydro-1H-cyclopenta[a]phenanthren-17-one
- CAS Number: 1225-01-0
- PubChem CID: 9548753
- ChemSpider: 7827676
- UNII: 5W4XKU708V
- ChEBI: CHEBI:36412
- CompTox Dashboard (EPA): DTXSID10893662

Chemical and physical data
- Formula: C_{18}H_{28}O_{2}
- Molar mass: 276.420 g·mol^{−1}
- 3D model (JSmol): Interactive image
- SMILES: C[C@]12CC[C@@H]3[C@H]4CC[C@H](C[C@@H]4CC[C@H]3[C@@H]1CCC2=O)O
- InChI: InChI=1S/C18H28O2/c1-18-9-8-14-13-5-3-12(19)10-11(13)2-4-15(14)16(18)6-7-17(18)20/h11-16,19H,2-10H2,1H3/t11-,12+,13-,14+,15+,16-,18-/m0/s1; Key:UOUIARGWRPHDBX-CQZDKXCPSA-N

19-Norandrosterone, also known as 5α-estran-3α-ol-17-one, is a metabolite of nandrolone (19-nortestosterone) and bolandione (19-norandrostenedione) that is formed by 5α-reductase. It is on the list of substances prohibited by the World Anti-Doping Agency since it is a detectable metabolite of nandrolone, an anabolic-androgenic steroid (AAS). Consumption of androstendione products contaminated with traces of bolandione may also result in testing positive for nandrolone.

Traces of 19-norandrosterone may be naturally present in human urine. An experiment conducted on athletes showed that after a prolonged intense effort, the 19-norandrosterone concentration can be increased by a factor varying between 2 and 4, but another study failed to replicate the result. Concentration also increases in the urine of female athletes during menstruation. The consumption of edible parts of a non-castrated pig, containing 19-nortestosterone, has been shown to result in the excretion of 19-norandrosterone in the following hours, so athletes should prudently avoid meals composed of pig offal in the hours preceding doping tests. Consumption of boar meat, liver, kidneys and heart also increased 19-norandrosterone output.

== See also ==
- Androsterone
- 19-Noretiocholanolone
- 5α-Dihydronandrolone
- 5α-Dihydronorethisterone
