= Clostebol acetate =

Chemical compound

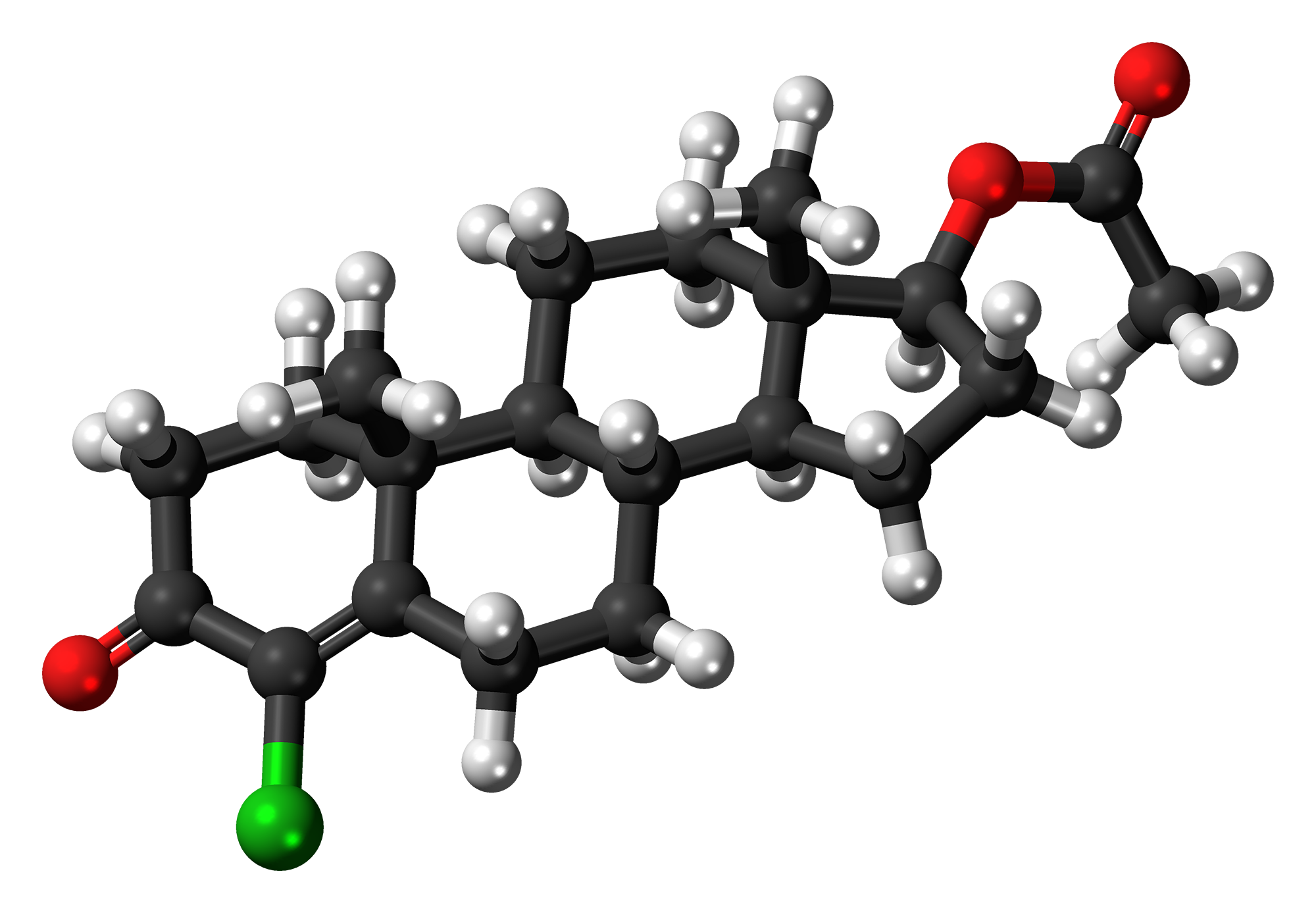

Clinical data
- Trade names: Macrobin, Steranabol, Alfa-Trofodermin, Megagrisevit
- Other names: 4-Chlorotestosterone acetate; 4-CLTA; 4-Chloroandrost-4-en-17β-ol-3-one 17β-acetate; NSC-72159
- Routes of administration: Intramuscular injection

Identifiers
- IUPAC name: [(8R,9S,10R,13S,14S,17S)-4-Chloro-10,13-dimethyl-3-oxo-1,2,6,7,8,9,11,12,14,15,16,17-dodecahydrocyclopenta[a]phenanthren-17-yl] acetate
- CAS Number: 855-19-6
- PubChem CID: 13327
- DrugBank: DB15984
- ChemSpider: 12762
- UNII: 780ZZX4P14
- KEGG: C18374
- ChEBI: CHEBI:81712
- ChEMBL: ChEMBL519327
- CompTox Dashboard (EPA): DTXSID00234702
- ECHA InfoCard: 100.011.565

Chemical and physical data
- Formula: C_{21}H_{29}ClO_{3}
- Molar mass: 364.91 g·mol^{−1}
- 3D model (JSmol): Interactive image
- SMILES: CC(=O)O[C@H]1CC[C@@H]2[C@@]1(CC[C@H]3[C@H]2CCC4=C(C(=O)CC[C@]34C)Cl)C
- InChI: InChI=1S/C21H29ClO3/c1-12(23)25-18-7-6-14-13-4-5-16-19(22)17(24)9-11-20(16,2)15(13)8-10-21(14,18)3/h13-15,18H,4-11H2,1-3H3/t13-,14-,15-,18-,20+,21-/m0/s1; Key:XYGMEFJSKQEBTO-KUJXMBTLSA-N

Clostebol acetate (BAN; brand names Macrobin, Steranabol, Alfa-Trofodermin, and Megagrisevit; also known as 4-chlorotestosterone 17β-acetate (4-CLTA) or 4-chloroandrost-4-en-17β-ol-3-one 17β-acetate) is a synthetic, injected anabolic-androgenic steroid (AAS) and a derivative of testosterone that is marketed in Germany and Italy. It is an androgen ester – specifically, the C17β acetate ester of clostebol (4-chlorotestosterone) – and acts as a prodrug of clostebol in the body. Clostebol acetate is administered via intramuscular injection.

== See also ==
- Clostebol caproate
- Clostebol propionate
- Norclostebol
- Norclostebol acetate
- Oxabolone
- Oxabolone cipionate
