= Clostebol caproate =

Chemical compound

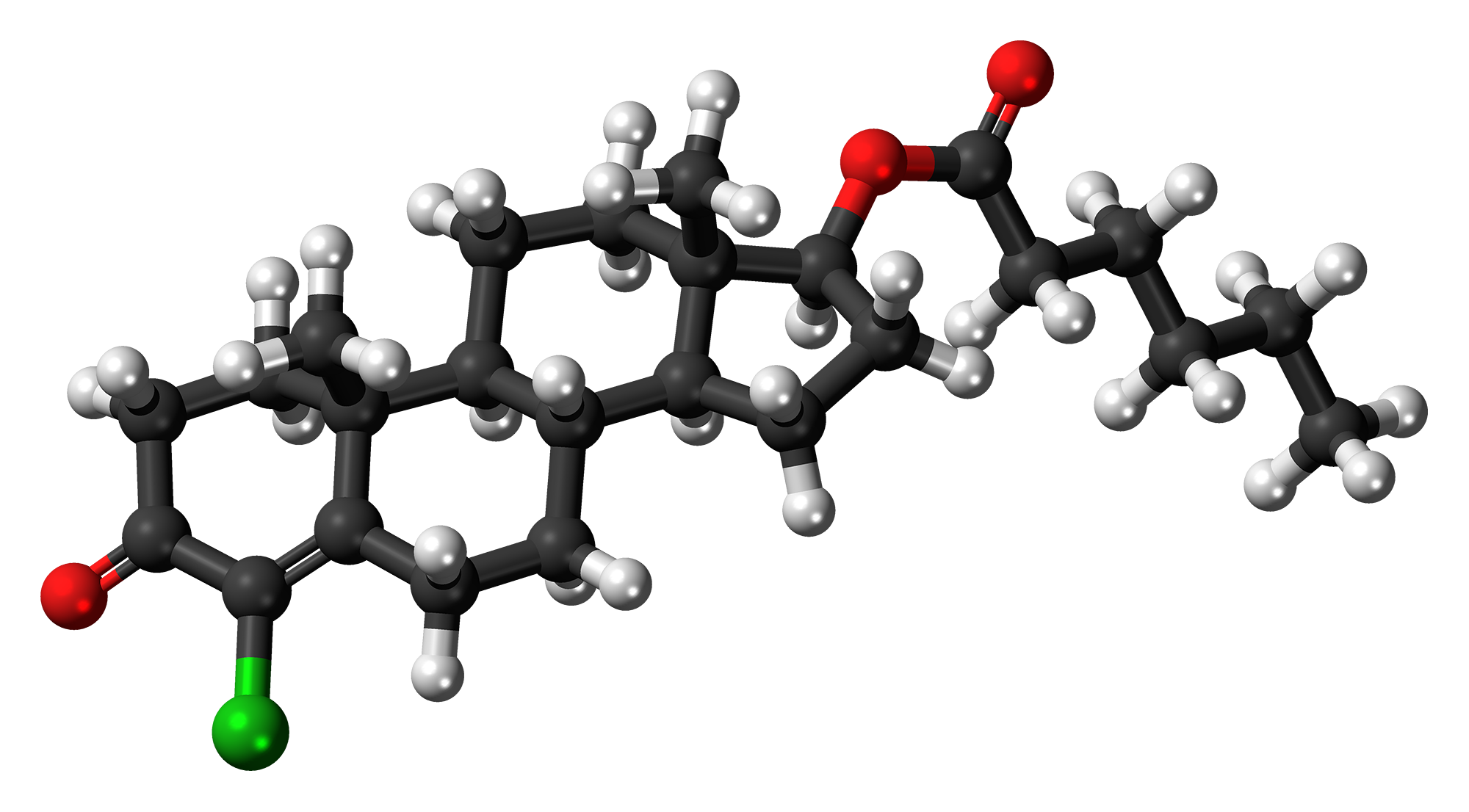

Clinical data
- Trade names: Macrobin-Depot
- Routes of administration: Intramuscular injection

Identifiers
- IUPAC name: (1S,2R,10R,11S,14S,15S)-6-Chloro-2,15-dimethyl-5-oxotetracyclo[8.7.0.0^{2,7}.0^{11,15}]heptadec-6-en-14-yl hexanoate
- CAS Number: 32361-10-7
- ChemSpider: 8246328
- UNII: 300383E96A

Chemical and physical data
- Formula: C_{25}H_{37}ClO_{3}
- Molar mass: 421.02 g·mol^{−1}
- 3D model (JSmol): Interactive image
- SMILES: CCCCCC(=O)O[C@H]1CC[C@H]2[C@@H]3CCC4=C(Cl)C(=O)CC[C@]4(C)[C@H]3CC[C@]12C
- InChI: InChI=1S/C25H37ClO3/c1-4-5-6-7-22(28)29-21-11-10-17-16-8-9-19-23(26)20(27)13-15-24(19,2)18(16)12-14-25(17,21)3/h16-18,21H,4-15H2,1-3H3/t16-,17-,18-,21-,24?,25?/m0/s1; Key:OMNUNHQDARKLSM-VPKDWVKTSA-N

Clostebol caproate (brand name Macrobin-Depot), also known as clostebol hexanoate or chlorotestosterone caproate (JAN), as well as 4-chlorotestosterone 17β-caproate or as 4-chloroandrost-4-en-17β-ol-3-one 17β-caproate, is a synthetic, injected anabolic-androgenic steroid (AAS) and a derivative of testosterone. It is an androgen ester – specifically, the C17β caproate ester of clostebol (4-chlorotestosterone) – and acts as a prodrug of clostebol in the body. Clostebol acetate is administered via intramuscular injection.

== See also ==
- Clostebol acetate
- Clostebol propionate
- Norclostebol
- Norclostebol acetate
- Oxabolone
- Oxabolone cipionate
