= Clostebol propionate =

Chemical compound

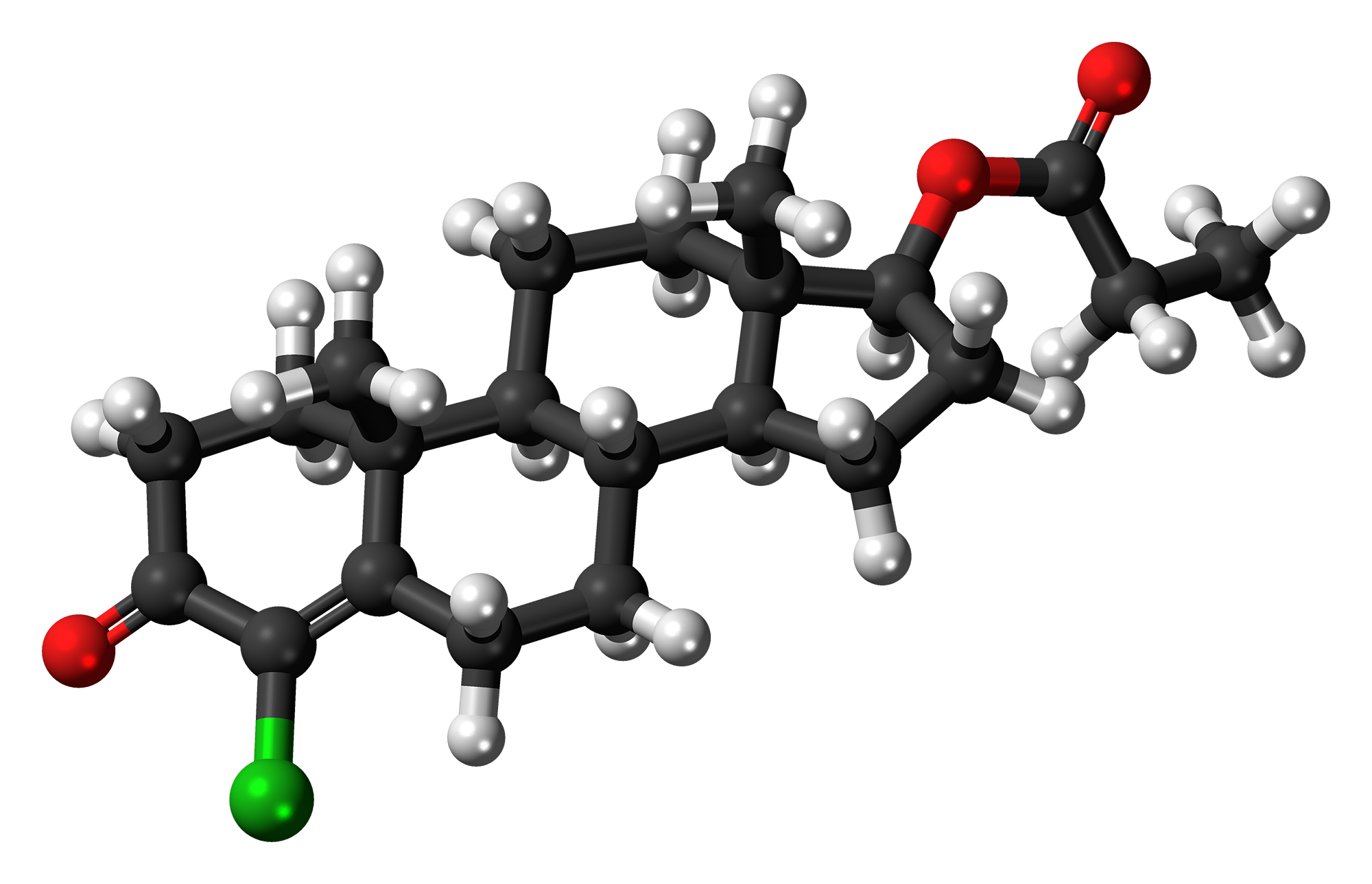

Clinical data
- Trade names: Yonchlon
- Routes of administration: Intramuscular injection

Identifiers
- IUPAC name: [(8R,9S,10R,13S,14S,17S)-4-Chloro-10,13-dimethyl-3-oxo-1,2,6,7,8,9,11,12,14,15,16,17-dodecahydrocyclopenta[a]phenanthren-17-yl] propanoate
- CAS Number: 2162-44-9
- PubChem CID: 71586790
- ChemSpider: 32698327
- UNII: 7JJ3052NOU
- CompTox Dashboard (EPA): DTXSID70176009

Chemical and physical data
- Formula: C_{22}H_{31}ClO_{3}
- Molar mass: 378.94 g·mol^{−1}
- 3D model (JSmol): Interactive image
- SMILES: CCC(=O)O[C@H]1CC[C@@H]2[C@@]1(CC[C@H]3[C@H]2CCC4=C(C(=O)CC[C@]34C)Cl)C
- InChI: InChI=1S/C22H31ClO3/c1-4-19(25)26-18-8-7-14-13-5-6-16-20(23)17(24)10-12-21(16,2)15(13)9-11-22(14,18)3/h13-15,18H,4-12H2,1-3H3/t13-,14-,15-,18-,21+,22-/m0/s1; Key:WNUBDFJMQBMNQB-DXODLALXSA-N

Clostebol propionate (brand name Yonchlon), also known as 4-chlorotestosterone 17β-propionate or as 4-chloroandrost-4-en-17β-ol-3-one 17β-propionate, is a synthetic, injected anabolic-androgenic steroid (AAS) and a derivative of testosterone. It is an androgen ester – specifically, the C17β propionate ester of clostebol (4-chlorotestosterone) – and acts as a prodrug of clostebol in the body. Clostebol acetate is administered via intramuscular injection.

== See also ==
- Clostebol acetate
- Clostebol caproate
- Norclostebol
- Norclostebol acetate
- Oxabolone
- Oxabolone cipionate
