= Norclostebol acetate =

Synthetic, injectable anabolic-androgenic steroid

Clinical data
- Trade names: Anabol 4-19
- Routes of administration: Intramuscular injection

Identifiers
- IUPAC name: [(8R,9S,10R,13S,14S)-4-Chloro-13-methyl-3-oxo-2,6,7,8,9,10,11,12,14,15,16,17-dodecahydro-1H-cyclopenta[a]phenanthren-17-yl] acetate
- CAS Number: 1164-99-4
- PubChem CID: 101730066
- ChemSpider: 91682
- UNII: JKP2S7674A

Chemical and physical data
- Formula: C_{20}H_{27}ClO_{3}
- Molar mass: 350.88 g·mol^{−1}
- 3D model (JSmol): Interactive image
- SMILES: CC(=O)OC1CC[C@@H]2[C@@]1(CC[C@H]3[C@H]2CCC4=C(C(=O)CC[C@H]34)Cl)C
- InChI: InChI=1S/C20H27ClO3/c1-11(22)24-18-8-6-16-14-3-4-15-12(5-7-17(23)19(15)21)13(14)9-10-20(16,18)2/h12-14,16,18H,3-10H2,1-2H3/t12-,13-,14-,16+,18?,20+/m1/s1; Key:FNMAFGQVNCRKGS-FOMDFYGASA-N

Norclostebol acetate (also known as norchlorotestosterone acetate, NClTA, 4-chloro-19-nortestosterone 17β-acetate, or 4-chloroestr-4-en-17β-ol-3-one; brand name Anabol 4-19) is a synthetic, injectable anabolic-androgenic steroid (AAS) and derivative of 19-nortestosterone (nandrolone). It is an androgen ester – specifically, the C17β acetate ester of norclostebol (4-chloro-19-nortestosterone).

== See also ==
- Clostebol
- Clostebol acetate
- Clostebol caproate
- Clostebol propionate
- Oxabolone
- Oxabolone cipionate
