= List of Major League Baseball players suspended for performance-enhancing drugs =

In February 2004, Major League Baseball announced a new drug policy which originally included random, offseason testing and 10-day suspensions for first-time offenders, 30 days for second-time offenders, 60 days for third-time offenders, and one year for fourth-time offenders, all without pay, in an effort to curtail performance-enhancing drug use (PED) in professional baseball. This policy strengthened baseball's pre-existing ban on controlled substances, including steroids, which has been in effect since 1991. The policy was to be reviewed in 2008, but under pressure from the U.S. Congress, on November 15, 2005, players and owners agreed to tougher penalties; a 50-game suspension for a first offense, a 100-game suspension for a second, and a lifetime ban for a third.

In December 2009, Sports Illustrated named baseball's steroid scandal of performance-enhancing drugs as the number one sports story of the decade of the 2000s.

The current penalties, adopted on March 28, 2014, are 80 games for a first offense, 162 games for a second offense, and a permanent suspension ("lifetime ban") for a third. Players are also ineligible from participating in the post-season the same year they receive a suspension, regardless of when their suspension is completed, unless the penalty is reduced on appeal. Players receiving a permanent suspension would be able apply to the Commissioner of Baseball for reinstatement after one year, which, if granted, can occur not sooner than two years after the suspension started.

== Suspended players ==
Players are ordered by the announced date of their suspension, placed in the appropriate table per their MLB experience and roster status at the time they were suspended. Players who are active in professional baseball (not limited to MLB) are listed in italics; players who have retired or have been a free agent for over a year are not considered "active".

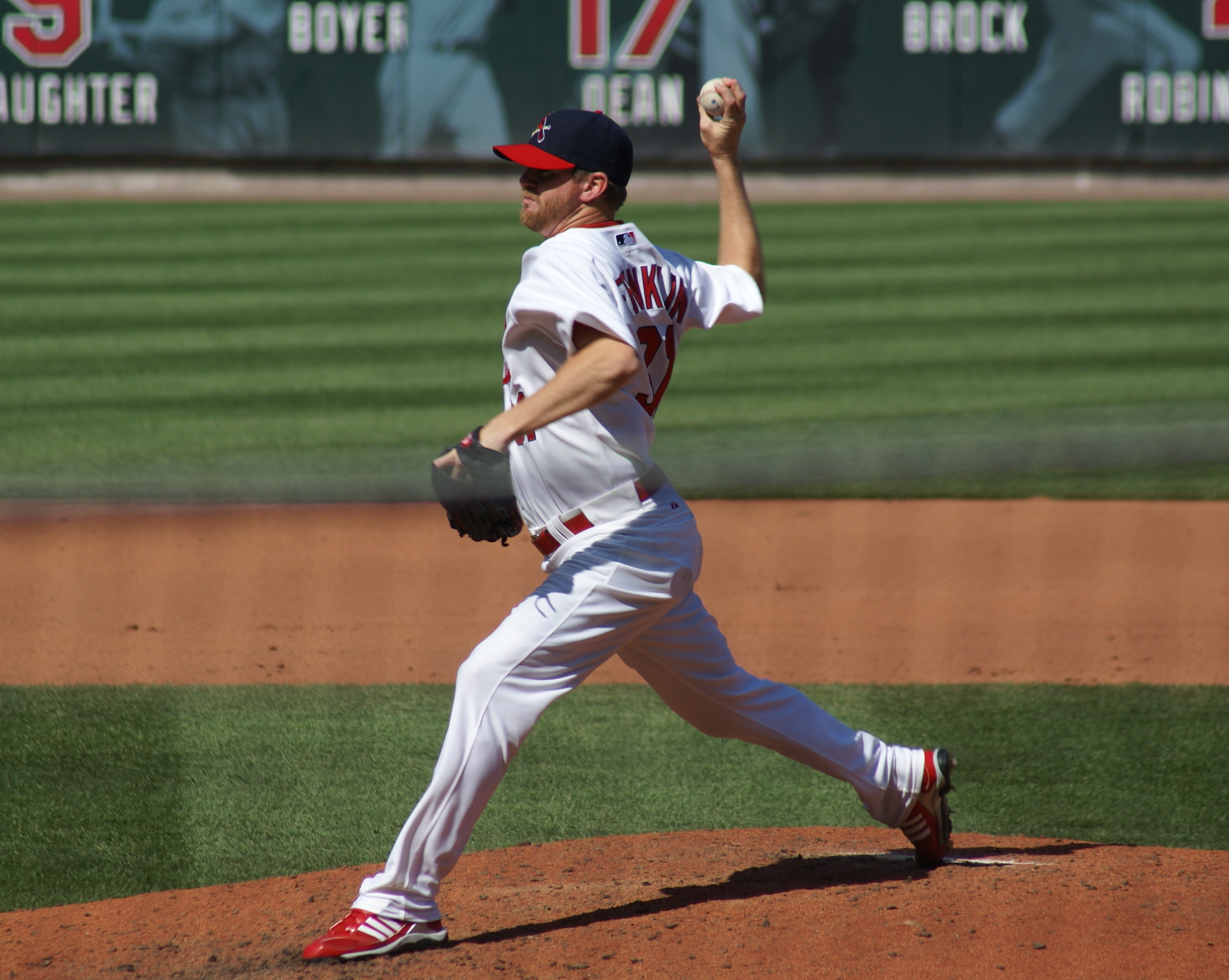
Ryan Franklin was suspended in 2005.

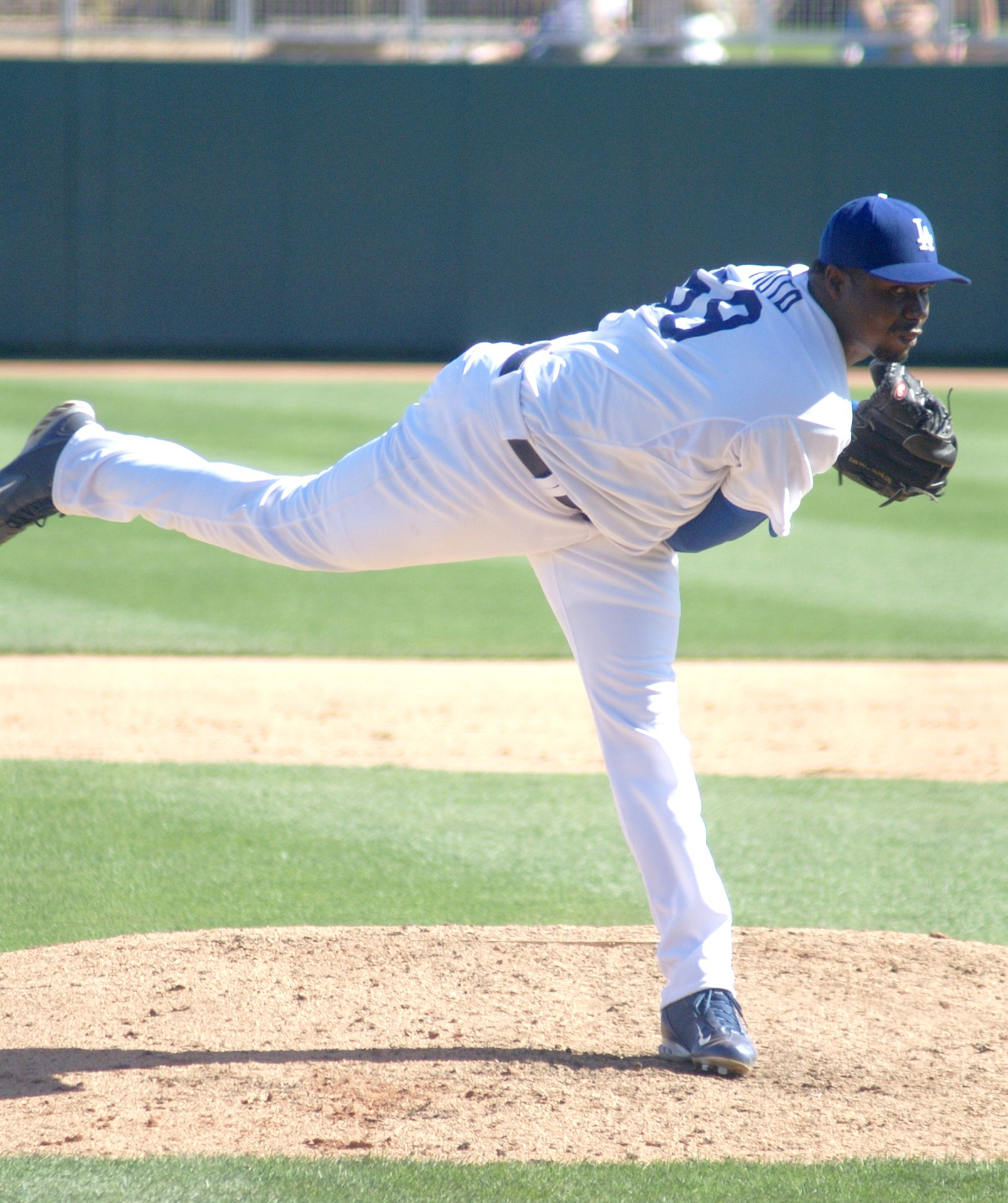
While playing for the New York Mets in 2006 Guillermo Mota was suspended for 50 games.

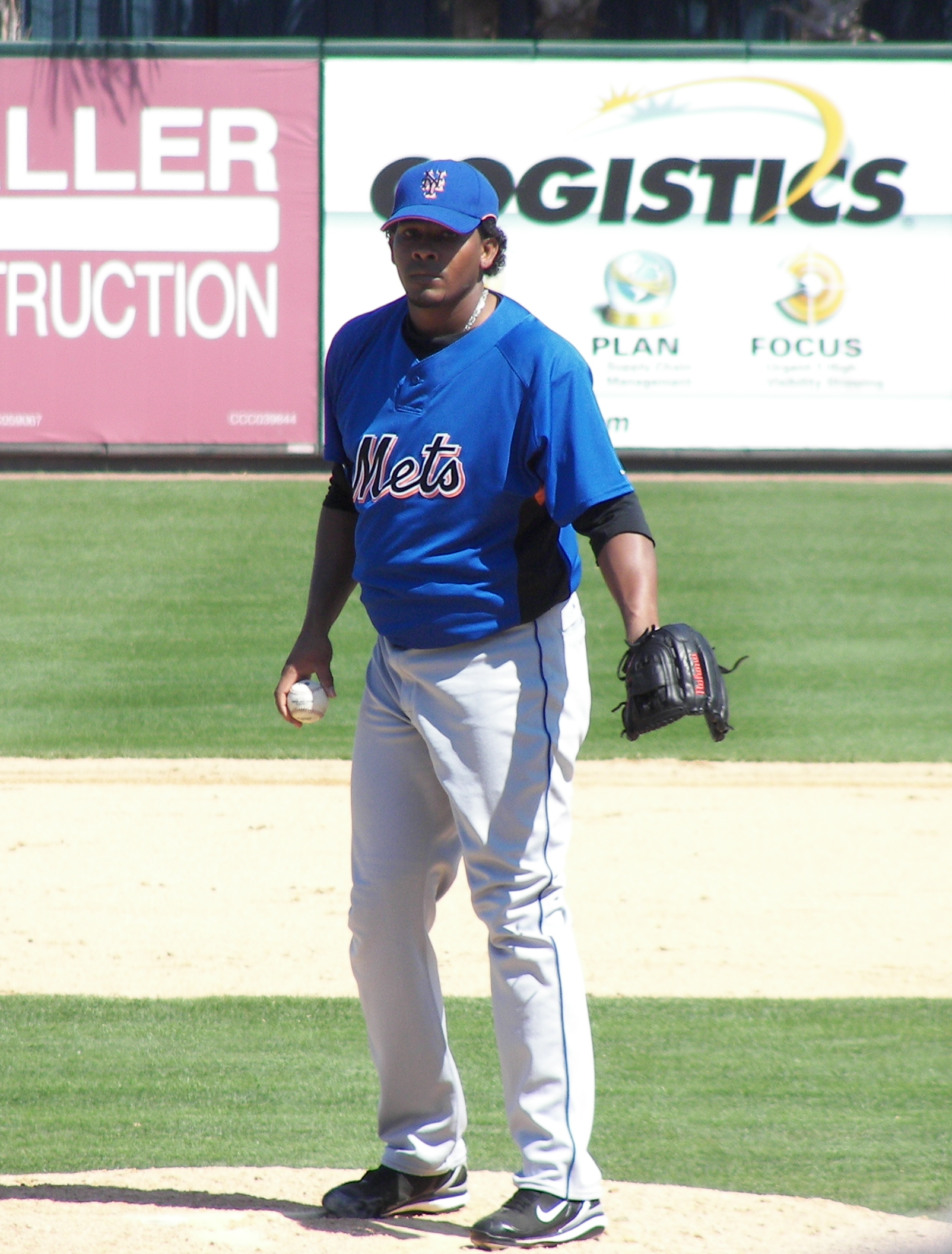
In 2007, Jorge Sosa was suspended 50 games.

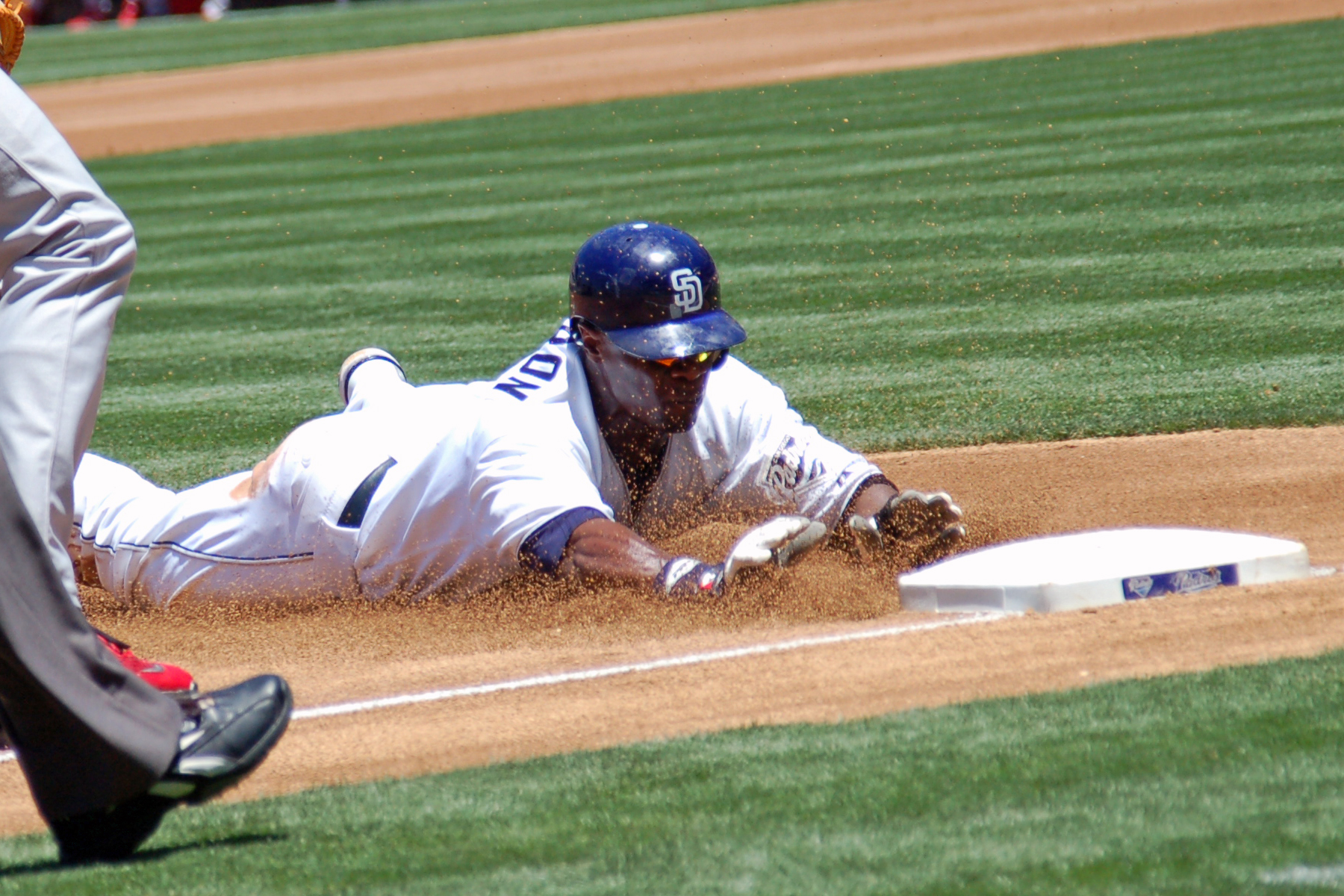
At the end of the 2007 season, Mike Cameron was suspended for 25 games, effective the next season.

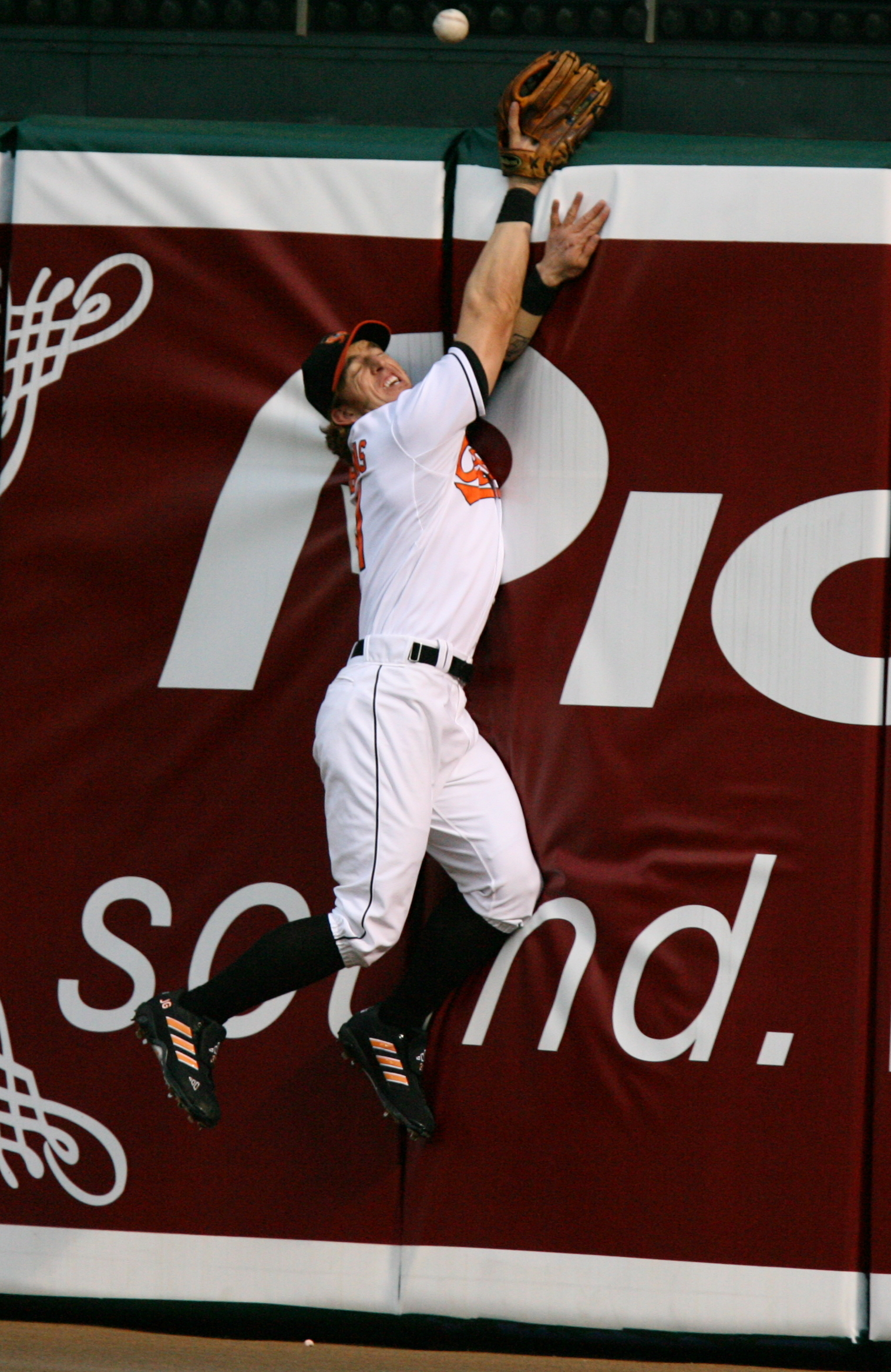
Jay Gibbons was suspended before the start of the 2008 season.

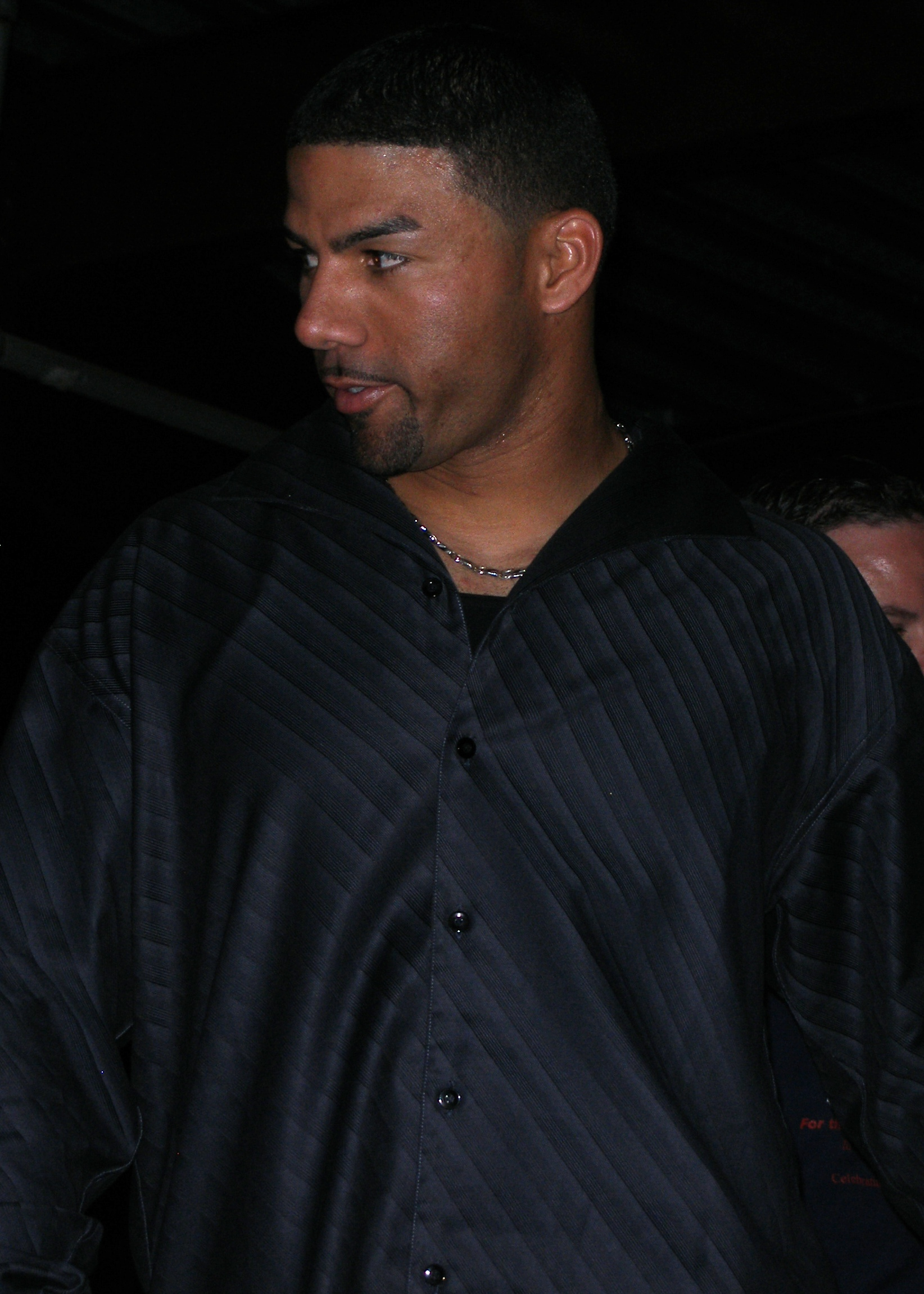
J. C. Romero was suspended for 50 games in 2009.

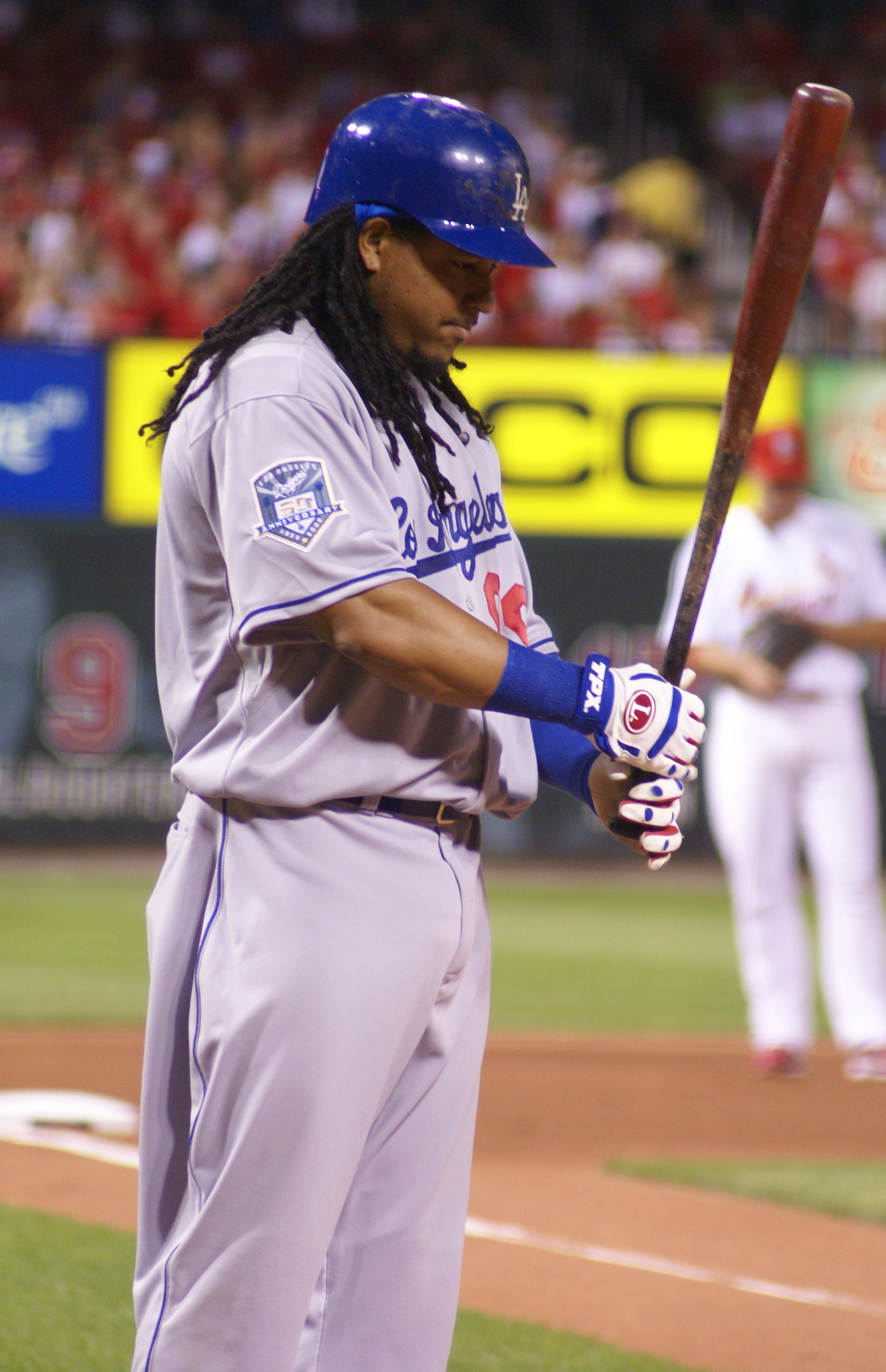
Manny Ramírez was suspended under Major League Baseball's drug policy in 2009 and 2011.

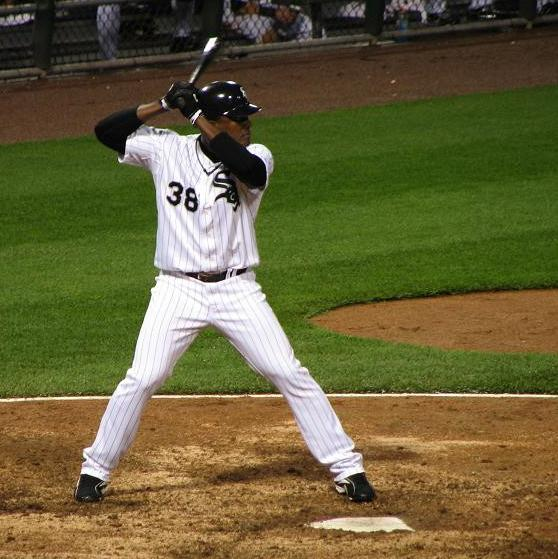
In 2009, Pablo Ozuna was suspended 50 games while in the Philadelphia Phillies organization.

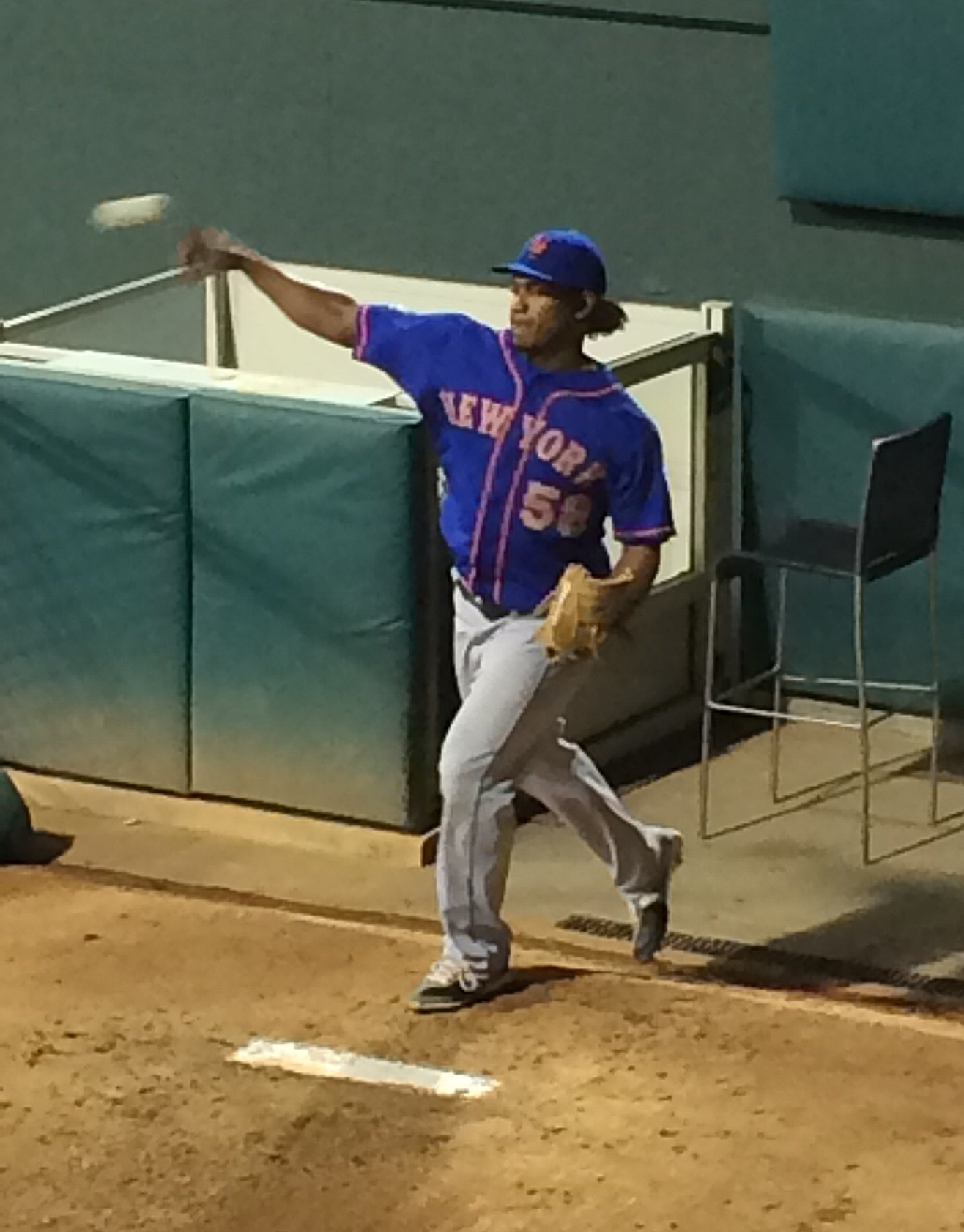
Jenrry Mejía was the first player to violate MLB's drug policy three times.

Key
^	Suspension lasted more than 100 games
	Major League Baseball All-Star
MVP	Major League Baseball Most Valuable Player
SS	Silver Slugger Award winner
GG	Gold Glove award winner
P	Pitcher
C	Catcher
1B	First baseman
2B	Second baseman
3B	Third baseman
SS	Shortstop
OF	Outfielder
DH	Designated hitter
UT	Utility player
†	Player was named in the Mitchell Report (may or may not be related to suspension)
(#)	Number of times the player was suspended (if more than once)
Italics	Currently active

=== Players who were on major league rosters ===
Players listed in this section were active in MLB at the time of their suspension.

Player	Team	Date announced	Drug	Penalty	Position	Response	Ref.
Alex Sánchez	Tampa Bay Devil Rays	April 3, 2005		10 days	OF	(Note: Alex Sánchez said this about his suspension: "I take some kind of stuff I buy over the counter. Multi-vitamin, protein shakes, muscle relaxers, that kind of stuff. Over-the-counter stuff. Stuff to give me energy. I'm surprised because look at what kind of player I am. I never hit any home runs. I don't know. It surprised me.")	
Jorge Piedra	Colorado Rockies	April 11, 2005		10 days	OF	(Note: Jorge Piedra reportedly expected the suspension and said the positive test was caused by a drug he was prescribed for a previous injury, stating: "It was for an injury. Obviously I would have never taken it had I known.")	
Agustín Montero	Texas Rangers	April 20, 2005		10 days	P	(Note: Agustín Montero and the Major League Baseball Players' Association (MLBPA) filed a grievance after his suspension, saying the penalty was "discipline without just cause.")	
Jamal Strong	Seattle Mariners	April 26, 2005		10 days	OF	(Note: Though Jamal Strong did not comment, the Seattle Mariners issued a statement on the matter of drug use in their organization stating, "We are extremely disappointed with our players who have been suspended. While we support those players, we also support the efforts of Major League Baseball to rid baseball of performing enhancing drugs.")	
Juan Rincón	Minnesota Twins	May 2, 2005		10 days	P	(Note: Juan Rincón said this about his suspension: "Baseball is my life and I was devastated after becoming aware that I tested positive for a violation of Major League Baseball's Joint Drug Prevention and Treatment Program. The details are confidential and I have asked the player's association to challenge the suspension...What I can share with you today is that I would never knowingly compromise my position within Major League Baseball or jeopardize my relationship with the Minnesota Twins organization or the relationships that I enjoy with my teammates.")	
Rafael Betancourt	Cleveland Indians	July 8, 2005		10 days	P	(Note: Rafael Betancourt said this about his suspension: "I am very angry and disappointed with Major League Baseball's decision to suspend me. I am going to file a grievance to clear my name. I am very sorry if this has caused any embarrassment and I apologize to my family, the Cleveland Indians organization, my teammates and all the fans...I look forward to resolving this matter and returning to the Indians as soon as possible.")	
Rafael Palmeiro^{†} SS GG	Baltimore Orioles	August 1, 2005	Stanozolol	10 days	DH	(Note: Rafael Palmeiro said this about his suspension: "I told the truth, and today I am telling the truth again that I did not do this intentionally or knowingly. I hope the fans understand that I worked very hard over a long 20-year career. I put in a lot of time and a lot of effort in my career. I made a mistake and I am facing it. I hope people learn from my mistake and I hope the fans forgive me...I went in front of Congress and I was honest with Congress. There's no absolute reason for me to do anything at this stage of my career. There's nothing for me to gain and everything for me to lose. I knew I was approaching 3,000 hits. I was not about to put everything on the line, my reputation and everything that I've worked for so hard in my life to do anything like this. It just makes no sense.")	
Ryan Franklin^{†}	Seattle Mariners	August 2, 2005		10 days	P	(Note: Ryan Franklin said this about his suspension: "There has to be a flaw in the system. I have no clue. I tested in [early] May and again three weeks later. The first was positive, the second was negative. There is a flaw in the testing or my urine got mixed up with somebody else's. They said that couldn't happen but I don't believe it...I just know deep in my heart that I'd never do anything like that...I was like, 'Are you kidding me?' I had just woken up from a nap and thought, 'There's no way this is happening to me.' I thought it was a joke.")	
Mike Morse	Seattle Mariners	September 7, 2005		10 days	SS	(Note: Mike Morse said this about his suspension: "First and foremost, I want to apologize to the fans, my teammates, the Mariners' organization, baseball and to my family. Back in November 2003 when I was 21 years old, I made an enormous mistake in my life: I took steroids while in the Minor Leagues. My thigh muscle, which I had previously torn, had never healed and I was scared that my career was over. I was desperate and made a terrible mistake which I deeply regret.")	
Carlos Almanzar	Texas Rangers	October 4, 2005		10 days	P	(Note: Though Carlos Almanzar did not comment, the Texas Rangers' owner Tom Hicks stated, "It's disappointing, it really is. Our players know the rules. They know they are going to be tested. If any of them get caught, shame on them. I am disappointed.")	
Félix Heredia	New York Mets	October 18, 2005		10 days	P	(Note: Though Félix Heredia did not directly comment, his agent, Martin Arburua, told The New York Times, "We're trying to figure out exactly what it is. Whatever it was, though, he did not knowingly take it. He wasn't playing and had no reason to. He was trying to rehab and get back.")	
Yusaku Iriki	New York Mets	April 28, 2006		50 games	P	(Note: Though Yusaku Iriki did not comment, the New York Mets released a statement saying, "The Mets are obviously disappointed that a member of our organization has tested positive.")	
Guillermo Mota	New York Mets	November 1, 2006		50 games	P	(Note: Guillermo Mota said this about his suspension: "I used extremely poor judgment and deserve to be held accountable. To my teammates and the entire Mets organization, I am sorry. I truly regret what I did and hope that you can forgive me...To baseball fans everywhere, I understand that you are disappointed in me, and I feel terrible and I promise this is the first and last time that this will happen.")	
Juan Salas	Tampa Bay Devil Rays	May 7, 2007		50 games	P	(Note: Though Juan Salas did not comment, the Tampa Bay Devil Rays said this: "The Tampa Bay Devil Rays fully support Major League Baseball's drug testing policy. We will do all we can to help Juan get his career headed back on a positive course.")	
Neifi Pérez GG	Detroit Tigers	July 6, 2007		25 games	UT	(Note: After his 25-game suspension, Neifi Pérez said this: "I say to my fans that I am not stupid. I know the difference between good and bad and there are things that are going to be known going forward, but my lawyer has advised me not to talk for now." After his 80-game suspension, Pérez stated: "It's not fair. They called three different positives on a 20-day-period. I was using a medicine that was supposedly authorized by the doctors due to a personal condition.")	
Neifi Pérez (2) GG	Detroit Tigers	August 3, 2007		80 games	UT		
Mike Cameron GG	San Diego Padres	October 31, 2007	Amphetamine	25 games	OF	(Note: Mike Cameron said this about his suspension: "The one thing I wanted to make sure was explained is, no steroids. I never took nothing like that before in my life. That would be 50 games, and that would affect me a whole lot more...After all of the analysis and testing, I can only conclude that a nutritional supplement I was taking was tainted.")	
José Guillén^{†}	Kansas City Royals	December 6, 2007		15 games	OF	(Note: Though José Guillén did not comment, the Kansas City Royals' general manager Dayton Moore stated, "We signed Jose knowing that was a possibility. While my initial reaction is one of disappointment, I am thoroughly convinced that Jose will put this behind him and we collectively support him as he begins a new chapter in his baseball life as a member of the Kansas City Royals.")	
Jay Gibbons^{†}	Baltimore Orioles	December 6, 2007		15 games	OF	(Note: Jay Gibbons said this about his suspension: "I am deeply sorry for the mistakes that I have made. I have no excuses and bare sole responsibility for my decisions. Years ago, I relied on the advice of a doctor, filled a prescription, charged the HGH, which is a medication, to my credit card and had only intended to help speed my recovery from my injuries and surgeries.")	
Eliézer Alfonzo	San Francisco Giants	April 30, 2008		50 games	C	(Note: Eliézer Alfonzo said this about his suspension: "I made a mistake, and I want to apologize to my family, my teammates, the fans and the Giants organization. I know what I did was wrong, and now I will pay the penalty. As a father, I now have to look my children in the eye and explain to them that I have made a big mistake, one, unfortunately, that they are also going to have to deal with, as well as me.")	
J. C. Romero	Philadelphia Phillies	January 6, 2009	Androstenedione	50 games	P	(Note: J. C. Romero said this about his suspension: "I still cannot see where I did something wrong. There is nothing that should take away from the rings of my teammates. I didn't cheat. I tried to follow the rules.")	
Manny Ramirez SS	Los Angeles Dodgers	May 7, 2009	Human chorionic gonadotropin	50 games	OF	(Note: Manny Ramirez said this about his suspension: "[A doctor] gave me a medication, not a steroid, which he thought was OK to give me. Unfortunately, the medication was banned under our drug policy. Under the policy, that mistake is now my responsibility. I have been advised not to say anything more for now.")	
Edinson Vólquez	Cincinnati Reds	April 20, 2010		50 games	P	(Note: Edinson Vólquez said this about his suspension: "Prior to the conclusion of last season, my wife and I sought medical advice in Cincinnati with the hope of starting a family. As part of my consultation with the physician, I received certain prescribed medications to treat my condition. As a follow up to our original consultation, my wife and I visited another physician in our home city in the Dominican Republic this past off-season. This physician also gave me certain prescribed medications as part of my treatment. Unfortunately, I now know that the medication the physician in the Dominican gave me is one that is often used to treat my condition, but is also a banned substance under Major League Baseball's drug policy. As a result, I tested positive when I reported to spring training. Although I understand that I must accept responsibility for this mistake and have chosen not to challenge my suspension, I want to assure everyone that this was an isolated incident involving my genuine effort to treat a common medical issue and start a family. I was not trying in any way to gain an advantage in my baseball career. I am embarrassed by this whole situation and apologize to my family, friends, fans, teammates, and the entire Reds Organization for being a distraction and for causing them any difficulty. I simply want to accept the consequences, learn from the mistake, and continue to strive to be the best person and baseball player I can be.")	
Ronny Paulino	Florida Marlins	August 20, 2010		50 games	C	(Note: Ronny Paulino said this about his suspension: "To control my weight this season, I used a dietary pill. Regretfully, I recently learned that the dietary pill contained a substance banned under Major League Baseball's drug policy. I am ashamed and saddened for disappointing and distracting my family, my teammates, the entire Florida Marlins organization and baseball fans. My heartfelt and most sincere apology.")	
Manny Ramirez (2) SS	Tampa Bay Rays	April 8, 2011		100 games (Note: Manny Ramirez chose to retire instead of submitting to the 100-game suspension. However, when he applied for reinstatement from the voluntarily retired list after the end of the season, the league and MLBPA agreed to reduce his suspension to only 50 games, effective as of the 2012 season.)	OF		
Eliézer Alfonzo (2)	Colorado Rockies	September 14, 2011		48 games (Note: Eliézer Alfonzo's 100-game suspension was reduced due to procedural issues with his test sample.)	C		
Guillermo Mota (2)	San Francisco Giants	May 7, 2012	Clenbuterol	100 games	P		
Freddy Galvis	Philadelphia Phillies	June 19, 2012	Clostebol	50 games	UT	(Note: Freddy Galvis said this about his suspension: "I have not and never would knowingly use anything illegal to enhance my performance. I have always tried to follow the team's strength and conditioning methods, listen to the trainers, work out hard and eat right. Unfortunately, the rules are the rules and I will be suspended.")	
Melky Cabrera	San Francisco Giants	August 15, 2012	Testosterone	50 games	OF	(Note: Melky Cabrera said this about his suspension: "My positive test was the result of my use of a substance I should not have used. I accept my suspension under the Joint Drug Program and I will try to move on with my life. I am deeply sorry for my mistake and I apologize to my teammates, to the San Francisco Giants organization and to the fans for letting them down.")	
Bartolo Colón	Oakland Athletics	August 22, 2012	Testosterone	50 games	P	(Note: Bartolo Colón said this about his suspension: "I apologize to the fans, to my teammates and to the Oakland A's, I accept responsibility for my actions and I will serve my suspension as required by the Joint Drug Program.")	
Yasmani Grandal	San Diego Padres	November 7, 2012	Testosterone	50 games	C	(Note: Yasmani Grandal said this about his suspension: "I apologize to the fans, my teammates, and to the San Diego Padres. I was disappointed to learn of my positive test and under the Joint Drug Program I am responsible for what I put into my body. I must accept responsibility for my actions and serve my suspension.")	
Carlos Ruiz	Philadelphia Phillies	November 27, 2012	Amphetamine	25 games	C	(Note: Carlos Ruiz said this about his suspension: "I am sincerely regretful for my mistake in taking a prohibited stimulant. I apologize to my teammates, the Phillies organization and the Philadelphia fans. I look forward to returning to the field and working toward bringing a championship back to Philadelphia in 2013.")	
Ryan Braun SS MVP	Milwaukee Brewers	July 22, 2013	Testosterone	Season (65 games)	OF	(Note: Ryan Braun said this about his suspension: "As I have acknowledged in the past, I am not perfect, I realize now that I have made some mistakes. I am willing to accept the consequences of those actions. This situation has taken a toll on me and my entire family, and it has been a distraction to my teammates and the Brewers organization. I am very grateful for the support I have received from players, ownership and the fans in Milwaukee and around the country. Finally, I wish to apologize to anyone I may have disappointed, all of the baseball fans especially those in Milwaukee, the great Brewers organization and my teammates. I am glad to have this matter behind me once and for all, and I cannot wait to get back to the game I love.")	
Nelson Cruz	Texas Rangers	August 5, 2013	(Note: These players were not suspended due to positive tests for specific drugs but due to their implication and involvement in the Biogenesis scandal.)	50 games	OF	(Note: Nelson Cruz said about his suspension: "I am thankful for the unwavering support from my family, friends, and teammates during this difficult time. I am looking forward to regaining the trust and respect of the Rangers' organization, my teammates and the great Rangers fans.")	
Jhonny Peralta	Detroit Tigers	August 5, 2013	(Note: These players were not suspended due to positive tests for specific drugs but due to their implication and involvement in the Biogenesis scandal.)	50 games	SS	(Note: Jhonny Peralta said about his suspension: ""In spring of 2012, I made a terrible mistake that I deeply regret, I apologize to everyone that I have hurt as a result of my mistake, including my teammates, the Tigers’ organization, the great fans in Detroit, Major League Baseball, and my family. I take full responsibility for my actions, have no excuses for my lapse in judgment and I accept my suspension.")	
Everth Cabrera	San Diego Padres	August 5, 2013	(Note: These players were not suspended due to positive tests for specific drugs but due to their implication and involvement in the Biogenesis scandal.)	50 games	SS		
Antonio Bastardo	Philadelphia Phillies	August 5, 2013	(Note: These players were not suspended due to positive tests for specific drugs but due to their implication and involvement in the Biogenesis scandal.)	50 games	P	(Note: Though Bastardo did not comment, the Phillies released a statement saying: "Obviously, the Phillies are very disappointed to learn of Antonio Bastardo's violation of Major League Baseball's Drug Program. We strongly believe in the Program and look forward to a time when performance enhancing drugs are completely out of baseball. Hopefully the sanctions announced today will bring us closer to that day. We respect the fact that Antonio has acknowledged his serious mistake and accepted his 50-game suspension.")	
Francisco Cervelli	New York Yankees	August 5, 2013	(Note: These players were not suspended due to positive tests for specific drugs but due to their implication and involvement in the Biogenesis scandal.)	50 games	C	(Note: Though Cervelli did not comment on the situation, the Yankees organization released a statement saying: "We are disappointed with the news today of the suspension of Francisco Cervelli. It's clear that he used bad judgment." Manager of the New York Yankees Joe Girardi also commented, saying: "I think the biggest thing is people learn from things that you've done in your life and you try to grow from it and take time to reflect on what you did and what you want to do in the future. For Cervelli, I think he had made strides this year as a player. I want him to come into Spring Training ready to go and try to learn from what has happened in [his] life.")	
Alex Rodriguez SS GG MVP	New York Yankees	August 5, 2013	(Note: These players were not suspended due to positive tests for specific drugs but due to their implication and involvement in the Biogenesis scandal.)	2014 season (162 games)^ (Note: Alex Rodriguez was initially suspended for 211 games, but continued to play the remainder of the 2013 season while he appealed the suspension. An arbitrator reduced his suspension to 162 games after the season, meaning Rodriguez missed the entire 2014 season. After dropping his subsequent federal lawsuits, Rodriguez served the suspension and returned for the 2015 season.)	3B	(Note: Alex Rodriguez said about his suspension: "The number of games sadly comes as no surprise, as the deck has been stacked against me from day one. This is one man's decision, that was not put before a fair and impartial jury. I have been clear that I did not use performance-enhancing substances as alleged in the notice of discipline, or violate the Basic Agreement or the Joint Drug Agreement in an matter, and in order to prove it I will take this fight to federal court.")	
Miguel Tejada^{†} SS MVP	Kansas City Royals	August 17, 2013	Amphetamine	105 games^	UT	(Note: Miguel Tejada said about his suspension: ""I apologize to my teammates, the Royals organization and to the Kansas City fans. I have a medical condition that requires medication to treat. I took that medication while re-applying for a Therapeutic Use Exemption. Under the requirements of the Joint Drug Program, I made a mistake in doing so.")	
Troy Patton	Baltimore Orioles	December 20, 2013	Amphetamine	25 games	P	(Note: Troy Patton said about his suspension: "I took one (Adderall) because I was stupid, it was the end of the season. It was just a stupid mistake. I don’t have trouble focusing all the time, it just enhances focus in certain situations, and I was just tired, basically. I don’t want to list that as an excuse. I know I took a banned substance. It was just a poor lapse in judgment.")	
Cameron Maybin	San Diego Padres	July 23, 2014	Amphetamine	25 games	OF	(Note: Maybin said about his suspension: "Unfortunately, in my attempts to switch back to a medicine that had been previously OK'd, I neglected to follow all the rules and as a result I tested positive.")	
Chris Davis	Baltimore Orioles	September 12, 2014	Adderall	25 games	1B		
David Rollins	Seattle Mariners	March 27, 2015	Stanozolol	80 games	P		
Ervin Santana	Minnesota Twins	April 3, 2015	Stanozolol	80 games	P	(Note: Santana said about his suspension: "I preach hard work, and don't believe in short cuts, I am very disappointed that I tested positive for a performance enhancing drug. I am frustrated that I can't pinpoint how the substance in question entered my body. I would never knowingly take anything illegal to enhance my performance.")	
Jenrry Mejía	New York Mets	April 11, 2015	Stanozolol	80 games	P	(Note: Mejía said about his suspension: "I know the rules are the rules and I will accept my punishment, but I can honestly say I have no idea how a banned substance ended up in my system.")	
Andrew McKirahan	Atlanta Braves	April 20, 2015	Ipamorelin	80 games	P	(Note: McKirahan said about his suspension: "I am extremely sorry for letting down the Atlanta Braves organization, my coaches, teammates and the Braves fans. This is in no way a reflection of my character or morals. I will work hard during my suspension and pray that everyone will find it in their hearts to forgive me.")	
Jenrry Mejía (2)	New York Mets	July 28, 2015	Boldenone, Stanozolol	162 games^	P		
Cody Stanley	St. Louis Cardinals	September 12, 2015	CDMT	80 games	C		
Jenrry Mejía (3)	New York Mets	February 12, 2016	Boldenone	Permanent^ (Note: Jenrry Mejía was reinstated from his permanent suspension in 2018.)	P		
Abraham Almonte	Cleveland Indians	February 26, 2016	Boldenone	80 games	OF		
Daniel Stumpf	Philadelphia Phillies	April 14, 2016	CDMT	80 games	P		
Chris Colabello	Toronto Blue Jays	April 22, 2016	CDMT	80 games	1B	(Note: Colabello said of his suspension "On March 13, I got one of the scariest and most definitely the least expected calls of my entire life. I was informed by the Players Association that a banned substance was found in my urine. I have spent every waking moment since that day trying to find an answer as to why or how? The only thing I know is that I would never compromise the integrity of the game of baseball. I love this game too much! I care too deeply about it. I am saddened more for the impact this will have on my teammates, the organization and the fans of the Toronto Blue Jays. I hope that before anyone passes judgement on me they can take a look at the man that I am, and everything that I have done to get to where I am in my career.")	
Dee Gordon SS GG	Miami Marlins	April 29, 2016	Clostebol, Testosterone	80 games	2B		
Josh Ravin	Los Angeles Dodgers	May 2, 2016	Pralmorelin	80 games	P		
Adalberto Mondesí	Kansas City Royals	May 10, 2016	Clenbuterol	50 games (Note: Adalberto Mondesi's 80-game suspension was reduced to 50 games because it was determined that his substance was ingested via cold medicine.)	SS		
Marlon Byrd (2)	Cleveland Indians	June 1, 2016	Ipamorelin	162 games^	OF		
Alec Asher	Philadelphia Phillies	June 16, 2016	CDMT	80 games	P		
Starling Marte GG	Pittsburgh Pirates	April 18, 2017	Nandrolone	80 games	OF		
David Paulino	Houston Astros	July 1, 2017	Boldenone	80 games	P		
Raudy Read	Washington Nationals	February 7, 2018	Boldenone	80 games	C		
Jorge Bonifacio	Kansas City Royals	March 10, 2018	Boldenone	80 games	OF		
Jorge Polanco	Minnesota Twins	March 18, 2018	Stanozolol	80 games	SS		
Robinson Cano SS GG	Seattle Mariners	May 15, 2018	Furosemide (Note: Furosemide is a diuretic, but not a performance-enhancing substance. However it is banned by the World Anti-Doping Agency and is often used as a masking agent for PEDs)	80 games	2B	(Note: Cano said of his suspension "Recently I learned that I tested positive for a substance called furosemide, which is not a performance-enhancing substance. Furosemide is used to treat various medical conditions in the United States and the Dominican Republic. This substance was given to me by a licensed doctor in the Dominican Republic to treat a medical ailment. While I did not realize at the time that I was given a medication that was banned, I obviously now wish that I had been more careful. For more than 15 years, playing professional baseball has been the greatest honor and privilege of my life. I would never do anything to cheat the rules of the game that I love, and after undergoing dozens of drug tests over more than a decade, I have never tested positive for a performance-enhancing substance for the simple reason that I have never taken one.")	
Welington Castillo	Chicago White Sox	May 24, 2018	Erythropoietin	80 games	C		
Eric Skoglund	Kansas City Royals	January 16, 2019	Ostarine, Ligandrol	80 games	P		
Steven Wright	Boston Red Sox	March 6, 2019	GHRP-2	80 games	P		
Francis Martes	Houston Astros	March 19, 2019	Clomiphene	80 games	P		
Frankie Montas	Oakland Athletics	June 21, 2019	Ostarine	80 games	P		
Tim Beckham	Seattle Mariners	August 6, 2019	Stanozolol	80 games	SS	(Note: Beckham said of his suspension: "I was recently notified that I had tested positive for Stanozolol, a prohibited substance under MLB's Joint Drug Agreement. I was given a product from a trusted source, who had advised me that it was safe to take. Regrettably, the product was tainted. I exercised my rights under the Joint Drug Agreement, and presented my case to an independent arbitrator. While I am disappointed in the result, I respect the ruling and understand my responsibilities under the Joint Drug Agreement. I accept full responsibility for putting myself in this position. I sincerely apologize to the Mariners' organization, the fans, my teammates, and my family for this mistake. I look forward to resuming my career once my suspension has been served.")	
Michael Pineda	Minnesota Twins	September 7, 2019	Hydrochlorothiazide	60 games (Note: Michael Pineda's 80-game suspension was reduced to 60 games because a compelling case was made that the substance was not taken as a masking agent for performance-enhancing drugs.)	P	(Note: Michael Pineda release a statement that read, in part: "I mistakenly took a medication that was given to me by a close acquaintance, who obtained it over-the-counter and assured me it would safely help me manage my weight. I ingested a few of these pills without the consent of the Twins' training staff. Testing revealed trace elements of a substance called Hydrochlorothiazide, which is a banned diuretic under baseball's testing program.")	
Francis Martes (2)	Houston Astros	February 17, 2020	Boldenone	162 games^	P		
Pablo Reyes	Pittsburgh Pirates	February 19, 2020	Boldenone	80 games	UT		
Domingo Leyba	Arizona Diamondbacks	March 6, 2020	Boldenone	80 games	INF		
Emmanuel Clase	Cleveland Indians	May 1, 2020	Boldenone	2020 season (60 games) (Note: Emmanuel Clase's 80-game suspension was revised to cover the entire 2020 season, which was shortened to 60 games amidst the COVID-19 pandemic. Tres Barrera's 80-game suspension was revised to cover the entire 2020 season, which was shortened to 60 games amidst the COVID-19 pandemic.)	P		
Tres Barrera	Washington Nationals	July 25, 2020	DHCMT	2020 season (60 games)	C		
Edgar Santana	Pittsburgh Pirates	July 28, 2020	Boldenone	80 games	P		
Robinson Cano (2) SS GG	New York Mets	November 18, 2020	Stanozolol	162 games^	2B		
Paul Campbell	Miami Marlins	May 3, 2021	CDMT	80 games	P		
Gregory Santos	San Francisco Giants	June 29, 2021	Stanozolol	80 games	P		
Hector Santiago	Seattle Mariners	July 29, 2021	Testosterone	80 games	P	(Note: Santiago said this about his suspension: "In 2020, while I was not on the roster of a MLB club, I consulted a licensed physician in Puerto Rico who diagnosed me with a condition and recommended hormonal replacement therapy. Because I did not play in 2020, I did not consider that this therapy could ultimately lead to a positive test under MLB's joint drug program. That said, I alone am responsible for what I put in my body, and I was not careful. Therefore, I have decided for forgo my right to an appeal in this matter and accept the suspension. I apologize for any harm this has caused the Seattle Mariners, Mariners' fans, my teammates, and most importantly, my family.")	
Ramón Laureano	Oakland Athletics	August 7, 2021	Nandrolone	80 games	OF	(Note: Laureano said this about his suspension: "I have worked too hard and given too much to this sport to disrespect or cheat the game that I love. I would never do anything to dishonor my family, teammates, and coaches or do anything to let down the many young ball players that look up to me. I take great care of my body and have an extremely regimented diet. Based on the minuscule amount that was briefly in my body, I've learned that it is likely that it was contamination of something I ingested. I have been educated about PEDs through the RBI program and Baseball Factory while growing up. I know I don't need any of that to perform on the baseball field. All my athletic success has come from my hard work, focus and dedication to the game.")	
Pedro Severino	Milwaukee Brewers	April 5, 2022	Clomiphene	80 games	C	(Note: Severino said this about his suspension: "Since late 2020, my wife and I had been trying to start a family unsuccessfully. When we returned to the Dominican Republic after the 2021 season, we sought medical assistance to determine why we had not succeeded. One of the doctors I consulted with prescribed me with a medication to treat infertility issues. Unfortunately, I now know that the medication contained Clomiphene. I accept responsibility for this mistake and have decided not to challenge my suspension.")	
J. C. Mejía	Milwaukee Brewers	May 17, 2022	Stanozolol	80 games	P		
Fernando Tatís Jr. SS	San Diego Padres	August 12, 2022	Clostebol	80 games	SS	(Note: "I have been informed by Major League Baseball that a test sample I submitted returned a positive result for Clostebol, a banned substance. It turns out that I inadvertently took a medication to treat ringworm that contained Clostebol. I should have used the resources available to me in order to ensure that no banned substances were in what I took. I failed to do so.")	
J. C. Mejía (2)	Milwaukee Brewers	September 20, 2023	Stanozolol	162 games^	P		
Noelvi Marte	Cincinnati Reds	March 8, 2024	Boldenone	80 games	3B		
Orelvis Martinez	Toronto Blue Jays	June 23, 2024	Clomiphene	80 games	2B		
Jurickson Profar SS	Atlanta Braves	March 31, 2025	Human chorionic gonadotropin	80 games	OF		
José Alvarado	Philadelphia Phillies	May 18, 2025	Testosterone	80 games	P		
Johan Rojas	Philadelphia Phillies	March 16, 2026	Boldenone	80 games	OF		
Jurickson Profar SS (2)	Atlanta Braves	March 19, 2026	Testosterone	162 games^	OF		

=== Players with major league experience on minor league rosters or free agents ===
This table lists players with prior MLB experience who, at the time of their suspension, were in Minor League Baseball or were a free agent.

Player	Team	Date announced	Penalty	Position	Response	Ref.
Francisco Córdova	Los Angeles Angels of Anaheim	April 4, 2005	15 games	P		
Robert Machado	Texas Rangers	April 4, 2005	15 games	C		
Damian Moss	Seattle Mariners	April 4, 2005	15 games	P		
Brian Mallette (2)	Pittsburgh Pirates	April 6, 2005	30 games	P		
Jon Nunnally	Pittsburgh Pirates	April 6, 2005	15 games	OF		
Tom Evans	Pittsburgh Pirates	April 6, 2005	15 games	3B		
Julius Matos	Toronto Blue Jays	April 6, 2005	15 games	IF		
Ricardo Rodríguez	Atlanta Braves	April 22, 2005	15 games	P		
Grant Roberts	New York Mets	April 22, 2005	15 games	P		
Randy Ruiz	Philadelphia Phillies	May 3, 2005	15 games	1B		
Darnell McDonald	Cleveland Indians	May 6, 2005	15 games	OF		
Guillermo Rodríguez	San Francisco Giants	May 12, 2005	15 games	C		
Jonathan Herrera	Colorado Rockies	May 12, 2005	15 games	IF		
Steve Smyth	Oakland Athletics	May 12, 2005	15 games	OF		
Jorge Toca	Chicago White Sox	May 12, 2005	15 games	1B		
Christian Parker	Colorado Rockies	May 12, 2005	15 games	P		
Luis Ugueto	Kansas City Royals	May 13, 2005	15 games	IF		
Wilson Delgado	Florida Marlins	May 13, 2005	15 games	SS		
Ramón A. Castro (2)	Washington Nationals	July 1, 2005	105 games^ (Note: Castro was suspended once for two separate violations.)	IF		
Josh Labandeira	Washington Nationals	July 1, 2005	15 games	SS		
Matt Whiteside	Toronto Blue Jays	July 15, 2005	15 games	P		
Randy Ruiz (2)	Philadelphia Phillies	July 22, 2005	30 games	1B		
Wilson Delgado (2)	Florida Marlins	August 12, 2005	30 games	SS		
Luis Ugueto (2)	Kansas City Royals	August 16, 2005	30 games	IF		
Matt Lawton	Free agent	November 2, 2005	10 days	OF	(Note: Matt Lawton said this about his suspension: "I made a terrible and foolish mistake that I will regret for the rest of my life. I take full responsibility for my actions and did not appeal my suspension. I apologize to the fans, the game, my family and all those people that I let down. I am truly sorry and deeply regret my terrible lapse in judgment.")	
Ramón Ramírez	Cincinnati Reds	April 11, 2006	50 games	P		
Nerio Rodríguez	Pittsburgh Pirates	May 19, 2006	50 games	P		
Abraham Núñez	San Francisco Giants	May 24, 2006	50 games	OF		
Yamid Haad	San Francisco Giants	May 31, 2006	50 games	C		
Jason Grimsley^{†}	Free agent	June 12, 2006	50 games	P	(Note: Jason Grimsley did not publicly comment, however, he did name Roger Clemens, Andy Pettitte, Miguel Tejada, Brian Roberts and Jay Gibbons as players who used performance-enhancing drugs in an affidavit to the U.S. Attorney's office. Grimsley requested and was granted his release by the Arizona Diamondbacks five days before he was suspended, which came a day after his home was raided by federal agents investigating performance-enhancing drug use, and chose to retire from baseball rather than face his suspension.)	
Daniel McCutchen	New York Yankees	August 8, 2006	50 games	P		
Francisco Cruceta	Texas Rangers	May 9, 2007	50 games	P		
Lino Urdaneta	New York Mets	May 16, 2007	50 games	P		
Ángel Salomé	Milwaukee Brewers	July 24, 2007	50 games	C		
Ryan Jorgensen	Cincinnati Reds	September 7, 2007	50 games	C		
Luther Hackman	Texas Rangers	October 30, 2007	50 games	P		
Dan Serafini	Free agent	November 27, 2007	50 games	P	(Note: Dan Serafini said this about his suspension: "I want to make it known that I did not use any banned substances in order to gain a competitive advantage. However, while playing baseball in Japan, I suffered two significant injuries...While trying to accelerate the healing process of these injuries, I took substances that were prescribed for me by a doctor in Japan.")	
Jordan Schafer	Atlanta Braves	April 8, 2008	50 games	OF		
Humberto Cota	Colorado Rockies	May 28, 2008	50 games	C		
Jorge Sosa	Seattle Mariners	August 21, 2008	50 games	P		
Runelvys Hernández	Houston Astros	September 6, 2008	50 games	P		
Henry Owens	Florida Marlins	November 11, 2008	50 games	P		
Sergio Mitre	New York Yankees (Note: Mitre failed his test while with the Marlins.)	January 6, 2009	50 games	P		
Pablo Ozuna	Philadelphia Phillies	June 11, 2009	50 games	IF		
Prentice Redman	Los Angeles Dodgers	June 25, 2010	50 games	OF		
Pedro López	Washington Nationals	July 27, 2010	50 games	SS		
Prentice Redman (2)	Los Angeles Dodgers	July 27, 2010	100 games	OF		
Omar Quintanilla	Colorado Rockies	August 11, 2010	50 games	UT		
Matt Kinney	San Francisco Giants	August 24, 2010	50 games	P		
Kevin Frandsen	Philadelphia Phillies	May 11, 2011	50 games	3B		
Luis Vizcaíno	Free agent	June 29, 2011	50 games	P		
Mike Jacobs	Colorado Rockies	August 18, 2011	50 games	1B	(Note: Jacobs said this about his suspension: "A few weeks ago, in an attempt to overcome knee and back problems, I made the terrible decision to take HGH. I immediately stopped a couple of days later after being tested. Taking it was one of the worst decisions I could have ever made, one for which I take full responsibility. I apologize to my family, friends, the Colorado Rockies organization, Major League Baseball and to the fans. Now, as required by the minor league drug program, I will serve a 50-game suspension. After my suspension is completed, I hope to have the opportunity to continue my career in the game that I love so much.")	
Rhyne Hughes	Baltimore Orioles	September 14, 2011	50 games	1B		
Timo Pérez	Free agent	October 4, 2011	50 games	OF		
Steven Shell	Free agent	January 24, 2012	50 games	P		
Dustin Richardson	Free agent	January 25, 2012	50 games	P		
Daryle Ward	Free agent	January 25, 2012	50 games	1B		
Marlon Byrd	Free agent	June 25, 2012	50 games	OF	(Note: Marlon Byrd said this about his suspension: "I made an inexcusable mistake. Several years ago, I had surgery for a condition that was private and unrelated to baseball. Last winter, I suffered a recurrence of that condition and I was provided with a medication that resulted in my positive test. Although that medication is on the banned list, I absolutely did not use it for performance-enhancement reasons. I am mortified by my carelessness and I apologize to everyone who loves this game as I do. I will serve my suspension, continue to work hard and hope that I am given an opportunity to help a club win later this season.")	
Ryan Adams	Baltimore Orioles	November 2, 2012	25 games	IF		
Cesar Carrillo	Detroit Tigers	March 15, 2013	100 games	P		
Daniel McCutchen (2)	Baltimore Orioles	April 6, 2013	50 games	P		
Michael O'Connor	Free agent	June 25, 2013	50 games	P		
Jordany Valdespin	New York Mets	August 5, 2013	50 games	OF	(Note: Jordany Valdespin said this about his suspension: "I made certain errors in judgment during the 2012 season and I accept full responsibility for those errors.")	
Jesús Montero	Seattle Mariners	August 5, 2013	50 games	C	(Note: Jesús Montero said this about his suspension: "I made a big, bad mistake last year. I don’t know what I was thinking. I’m here right now, this new year, to be better and to help my teammates and to help the team to win. I feel bad for all of my family and all of my teammates for what I did.")	
Sergio Escalona	Houston Astros	August 5, 2013	50 games	P	(Note: Though Escalona did not release a statement, the Astros organization released a statement saying: "We were disappointed to learn of the involvement of Sergio Escalona in relation to this matter for violating Major League Baseball's Joint Drug Prevention and Treatment Program, we fully support Major League Baseball's policy and its efforts to eliminate performance-enhancing substances from our game. Per the protocol outlined in the Joint Drug Program, the Astros will not comment further on this matter.")	
Fernando Martínez	New York Yankees	August 5, 2013	50 games	OF		
Fautino de los Santos	Free agent	August 5, 2013	50 games	P		
Jordan Norberto	Free agent	August 5, 2013	50 games	P		
Ronny Paulino (2)	Free agent	February 12, 2014	100 games	C		
Rhyne Hughes (2)	Free agent	February 21, 2014	100 games	1B		
Álex Colomé	Tampa Bay Rays	March 24, 2014	50 games	P	(Note: Though Colomé did not release a statement, the Rays organization released a statement saying: "We were disappointed to learn of Alex Colome's violation of Major League Baseball's Joint Drug Prevention and Treatment Program, we fully support Major League Baseball's policy and its efforts to eliminate performance-enhancing substances from our game.")	
Joel Piñeiro	Los Angeles Angels	June 30, 2014	50 games	P		
Ryan Adams (2)	Free agent	July 17, 2014	100 games	IF		
Wilson Betemit	Free agent	February 2, 2015	50 games	3B		
Arodys Vizcaíno	Atlanta Braves	April 2, 2015	80 games	P	(Note: Though Vizcaíno did not release a statement, Braves president of baseball operations John Hart said: "We're obviously very disappointed with what has transpired, hopefully he's going to be able to use this time to reflect and prepare for when he returns to play.")	
Wilking Rodríguez	New York Yankees	April 15, 2015	80 games	P		
Javy Guerra	Chicago White Sox	July 8, 2015	50 games	P	(Note: Though Guerra did not release a statement, White Sox assistant general manager Buddy Bell said: "We are always very disappointed when one of our players tests positive, but we know the testing program works, and all of our players also know that everyone in the White Sox organization and all of our resources are available to help at all times.")	
José Valverde	Free agent	August 14, 2015	80 games	P		
Brandon Mann	Oakland Athletics	February 16, 2016	80 games	P		
Kameron Loe	Chicago White Sox	March 29, 2016	80 games	P		
Taylor Teagarden	Free agent	April 1, 2016	80 games	C		
Cody Stanley (2)	Free agent	July 8, 2016	162 games^	C		
Drake Britton	Detroit Tigers	August 2, 2016	80 games	P		
Nate Schierholtz	Detroit Tigers	August 15, 2016	80 games	OF		
Cedric Hunter	Free agent	November 23, 2016	50 games	OF		
José Domínguez (2)	San Francisco Giants	April 6, 2017	142 games^	P		
Steve Delabar	Cleveland Indians	April 23, 2017	80 games	OF		
Robert Andino	Baltimore Orioles	May 31, 2017	50 games	IF		
Jair Jurrjens	Los Angeles Dodgers	June 15, 2017	80 games	P		
Joe Colon	Cleveland Indians	July 1, 2017	Season (82 games)	P		
Nik Turley	Pittsburgh Pirates	January 27, 2018	80 games	P		
Fernando Abad	New York Mets	June 7, 2018	80 games	P		
Mike Marjama	Retired (Note: Marjama had voluntarily retired in July 2018 but had applied for reinstatement from the voluntarily retired list before the suspension was announced.)	May 2, 2019	80 games	C	(Note: Marjama released a statement through the MLBPA denying knowingly taking a banned substance but acknowledged responsibility "for what goes in [his] body" and accepted the suspension without appeal.)	
Victor Alcántara	Free agent	February 21, 2020	80 games	P		
Danny Santana	Free agent	April 4, 2022	80 games	IF		
José Rondón	Free agent	April 4, 2022	80 games	IF		
Richard Rodríguez	Free agent	April 4, 2022	80 games	P		
Carlos Martínez	Free agent	May 27, 2022	80 games	P		
Derek Dietrich	New York Yankees	August 5, 2022	50 games	IF		
Max Kepler	Free agent	January 9, 2026	80 games	OF		

=== Players with only minor league experience ===
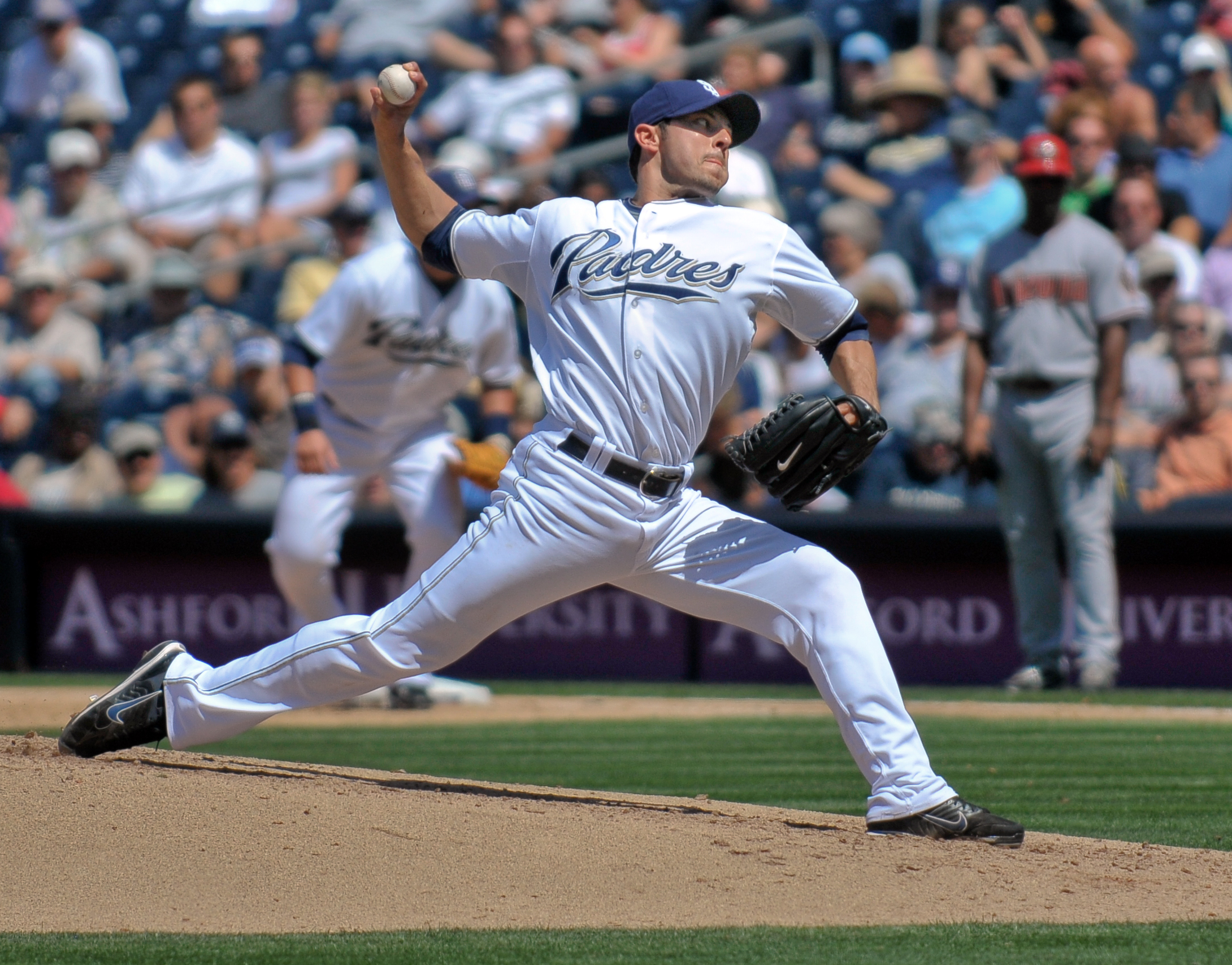
Clay Hensley was suspended 15 games in 2005 and made his major league debut later in the same year.

This table lists players who, at the time of their suspension, were in Minor League Baseball with no prior MLB experience.

Player	Organization	Date announced	Penalty	Position	Response	Ref.
Troy Cate	Seattle Mariners	April 4, 2005	15 games	P		
Robinson Chirinos	Chicago Cubs	April 4, 2005	15 games	C		
Willie Collazo	Los Angeles Angels of Anaheim	April 4, 2005	15 games	P		
Jesús Guzmán	Seattle Mariners	April 4, 2005	15 games	P		
Clay Hensley	San Diego Padres	April 4, 2005	15 games	P		
Eider Torres	Cleveland Indians	April 22, 2005	15 games	2B		
José Quintana	New York Mets	2007	50 games	P		
Matt West	Texas Rangers	August 30, 2007	50 games	P		
Jarrod Dyson	Kansas City Royals	February 14, 2009	50 games	OF		
José Domínguez	Los Angeles Dodgers	September 14, 2009	50 games	P		
Willson Contreras	Chicago Cubs	October 2, 2009	50 games	C		
Amauri Sanit	New York Yankees	May 28, 2010	50 games	P		
Dan Jennings	Florida Marlins	July 28, 2010	50 games	P		
Adrián Nieto	Washington Nationals	February 4, 2011	50 games	C		
Kennys Vargas	Minnesota Twins	August 10, 2011	50 games	IF		
Zach Collier	Philadelphia Phillies	September 8, 2011	50 games	OF		
Chaz Roe	Free agent	January 26, 2012	50 games	P		
André Rienzo	Chicago White Sox	April 26, 2012	50 games	P		
Danny Muno	New York Mets	May 18, 2012	50 games	IF		
Ranger Suárez	Philadelphia Phillies	July 13, 2012	50 games	P		
Ryan Brett	Tampa Bay Rays	August 23, 2012	50 games	IF		
Marcus Stroman GG	Toronto Blue Jays	August 28, 2012	50 games	P		
Gerson Bautista	Boston Red Sox	April 17, 2013	50 games	P		
Anderson Severino	New York Yankees	July 24, 2013	50 games	P		
César Puello	New York Mets	August 5, 2013	50 games	OF	(Note: César Puello said this about his suspension: "I made certain mistakes during the 2012 season and I accept full responsibility for those mistakes. I look forward to regaining the trust and respect of the Mets’ organization, Mets’ fans and my family, and ultimately helping the club win a championship.")	
Ji-man Choi	Seattle Mariners	April 17, 2014	50 games	1B	(Note: Ji-man Choi said this about his suspension: "I do not know what I could have taken that caused me to test positive. However, I also understand that without an explanation I must serve a suspension and I accept that.")	
Eddie Gamboa	Baltimore Orioles	June 13, 2014	50 games	P		
Boog Powell	Oakland Athletics	July 7, 2014	50 games	OF		
Nicky Delmonico	Milwaukee Brewers	July 28, 2014	50 games	IF		
Adalberto Mejía	San Francisco Giants	November 14, 2014	50 games	P		
Félix Bautista	Free agent	January 12, 2015	72 games	P		
Tim Peterson	New York Mets	February 10, 2015	80 games	P		
Tyler Sturdevant	Cleveland Indians	February 18, 2015	50 games	P		
Travis Demeritte	Texas Rangers	June 4, 2015	80 games	IF		
Michael Kopech	Boston Red Sox	July 16, 2015	50 games	P	(Note: Kopech denied knowingly taking or ever having heard of oxilofrine but issued a public apology nonetheless.)	
Beau Taylor	Oakland Athletics	November 15, 2016	50 games	C		
Jefry Rodríguez	Washington Nationals	May 26, 2017	80 games	P		
Yerry Rodríguez	Texas Rangers	June 9, 2017	75 games	P		
Stevie Wilkerson	Baltimore Orioles	December 12, 2017	80 games	IF		
Dean Deetz	Houston Astros	January 23, 2018	80 games	P		
Forrest Whitley	Houston Astros	February 21, 2018	80 games	P		
Thomas Pannone	Toronto Blue Jays	March 16, 2018	80 games	P		
Drew Maggi	Cleveland Indians	April 4, 2018	50 games	IF		
Michael Chavis	Boston Red Sox	April 6, 2018	80 games	3B	(Note: Michael Chavis said this about his suspension: "When I found out about this, I said, ‘Are you sure you found the right person?’ I was like, ‘No way.’ I went through everything that I possibly could have put in my body. I was like a mad scientist. I was like, ‘What if I took Zyrtec combined with this, would it show up with this?’ I was doing everything. I tore apart my closet, I tore apart anything but I don’t have an answer.")	
José Herrera	Arizona Diamondbacks	April 10, 2018	50 games	C		
Logan Webb GG	San Francisco Giants	May 1, 2019	80 games	P		
Justin Lawrence	Colorado Rockies	January 17, 2020	80 games	P		
Vladimir Gutiérrez	Cincinnati Reds	June 28, 2020	80 games	P		
Kent Emanuel	Houston Astros	August 6, 2020	80 games	P	(Note: Kent Emanuel said this about his suspension: “The conflict of interest that is presented to scientists in the anti doping labs – when it comes to helping players – has kept us from getting any help.”)	
Colton Welker	Colorado Rockies	May 6, 2021	80 games	IF	(Note: Colton Welker said this about his suspension: “I want to make it very clear that I have never willingly nor intentionally ingested any substance to enhance my athletic performance. Given the information provided to me by the Players Association and laboratory, the amount detected was so minimal that it would have no effect on enhancing my performance. I understand that a number of other players, like me, have tested positive for this metabolite at microscopic levels, and I intend to join them in seeking answers as to how this is happening in order to clear my name.”)	

=== Players with major league experience in a non-affiliated professional league ===
This table lists players with prior MLB experience who were suspended by a baseball league not affiliated with MLB, such as Nippon Professional Baseball in Japan or KBO League in Korea.

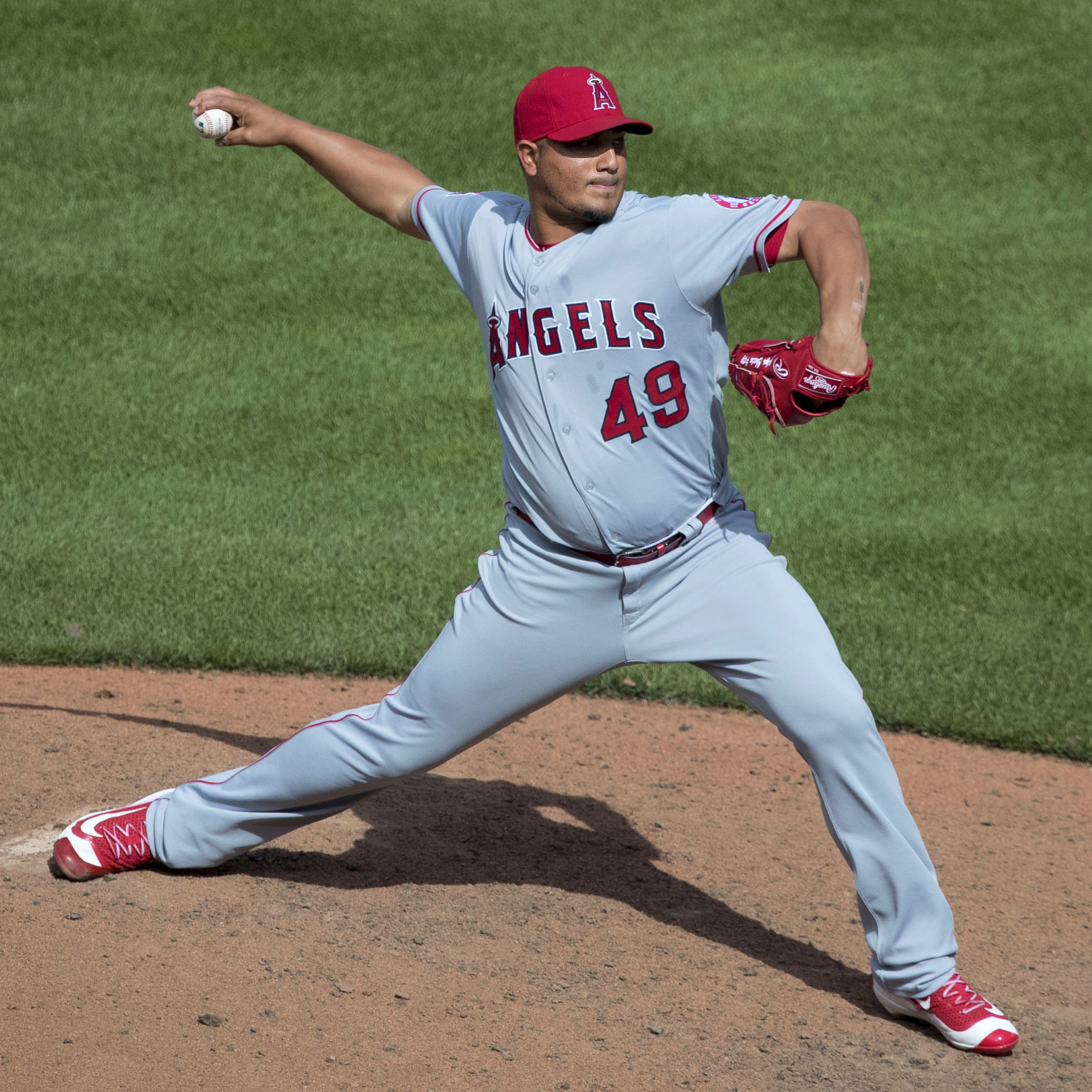
Jhoulys Chacín was twice suspended by the LVBP for doping.

Player	Organization (League)	Date announced	Penalty	Position	Ref.
Luis González	Yomiuri Giants (NPB)	May 26, 2008	One year	UT	
Danny Rios	Yakult Swallows (NPB)	June 28, 2008	One year	P	
Joey Gathright	Bridgeport Bluefish (ALPB)	October 2, 2012	50 games (Note: Although Gathright failed a test for an amphetamine while playing in the Atlantic League, he was also suspended by Major League Baseball.)	OF	
Jim Adduci	Lotte Giants (KBO)	July 1, 2016	36 games	OF	
Alex Cabrera (2)	Tigres de Aragua (LVBP)	May 15, 2017	50 games (Note: Alex Cabrera's suspension was 50 games because it was his second violation of the league's drug policy, even though his prior suspension had been overturned by a Venezuelan court.)	DH	
Alex Romero	Caribes de Anzoátegui (LVBP)	May 15, 2017	17 games	OF	
René Reyes	Águilas del Zulia (LVBP)	May 15, 2017	17 games	OF	
Josmil Pinto	Navegantes del Magallanes (LVBP)	May 15, 2017	10 games	C	
Jhoulys Chacin	Leones del Caracas (LVBP)	February 2024	12 games (Note: Jhoulys Chacin's 20-game suspension was reduced because he admitted to using the banned substance.)	P	
Guillermo Moscoso	Tigres de Aragua (LVBP)	February 27, 2024	20 games	P	
Willians Astudillo	Caribes de Anzoátegui (LVBP)	September 12, 2025	20 games	UT	
Jhoulys Chacin (2)	Leones del Caracas (LVBP)	September 12, 2025	60 games	P	
Cristofer Ogando	Navegantes del Magallanes (LVBP)	September 12, 2025	30 games	P	

=== Players with major league experience suspended from international competition ===
This table lists players with former or future MLB experience who were suspended from international play by the International Baseball Federation or World Baseball Softball Confederation for using performance-enhancing drugs in international competitions.

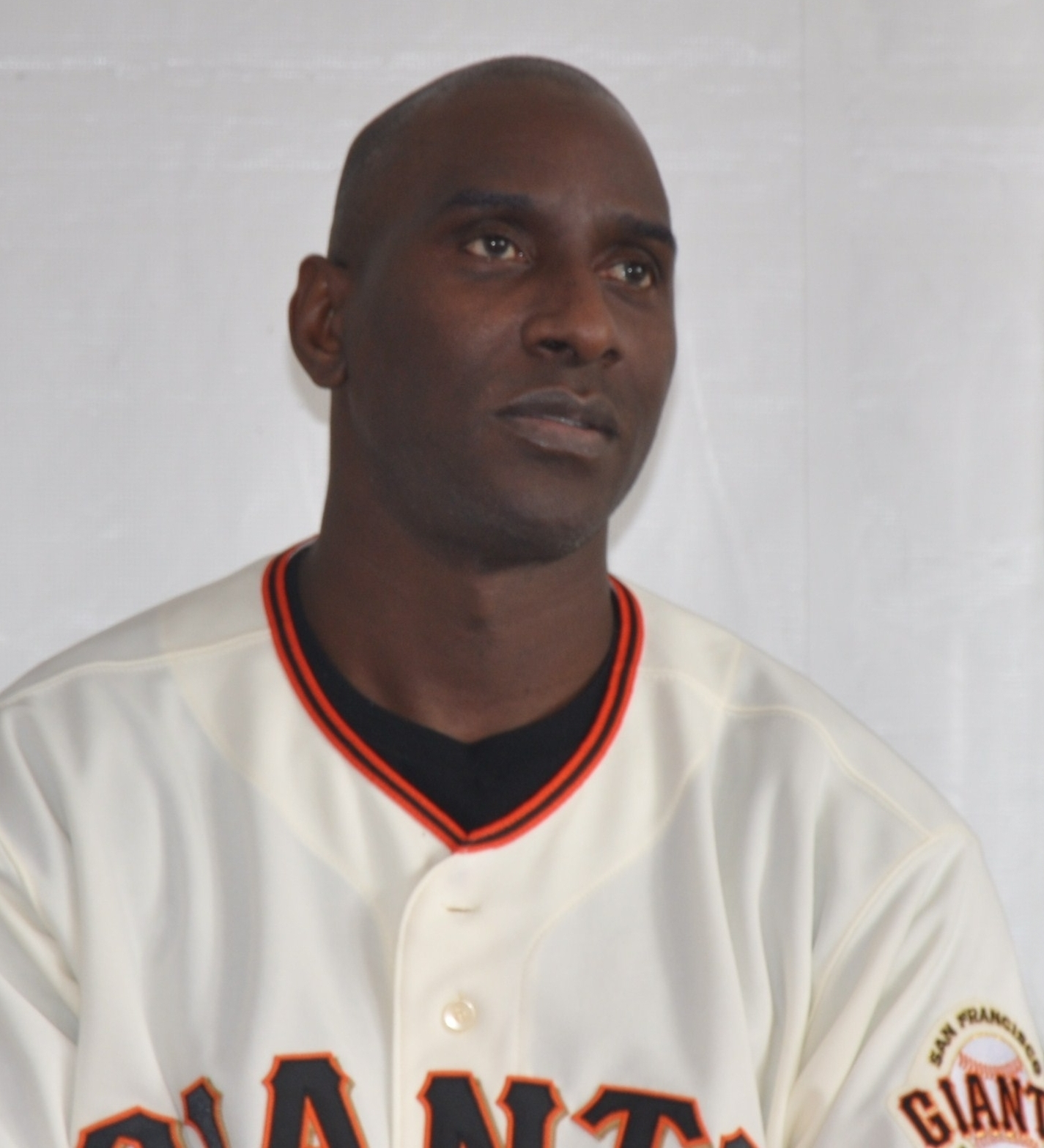
Panama was stripped of a bronze medal at the 2002 Intercontinental Cup after Roberto Kelly and three other players tested positive for banned substances.

Player		Competition	Substance	Penalty	Position	Ref.
Roberto Kelly	Panama	2002 Intercontinental Cup	Unsepcified steroid	Two years	OF	
Roberto Novoa	Dominican Republic	2002 Intercontinental Cup	Unsepcified steroid	Two years	P	
Sidney Ponson	Netherlands	2009 World Baseball Classic	Phentermine	Two years	P	
Bruce Maxwell	Germany	2023 World Baseball Classic qualification	Amphetamine	Four years	C	
Onelki García	Cuba	2023 World Baseball Classic	Ibutamoren, SARMS	Three years	P	
Fernando Salas	Mexico	2024 WBSC Premier12	Stanozolol	Four years	P	
Rubén Tejada	Panama	2024 WBSC Premier12	Drostanolone	Four years	SS	
Alexei Ramírez	Cuba	2026 World Baseball Classic	Mesterolone, metandienone, oxandrolone, stanozolol	Pending	OF	

== See also ==
- List of Major League Baseball players suspended for domestic violence
- List of people banned from Major League Baseball
- List of suspensions in the NFL
- List of people banned or suspended by the NBA
- Doping in baseball

== Footnotes ==
Players' responses
