= C29H44O3 =

The molecular formula C_{29}H_{44}O_{3} (molar mass: 440.66 g/mol) may refer to:

- Estradiol undecylate, an estrogen medication
- Mesterolone cipionate, a synthetic anabolic–androgenic steroid and an androgen ester
- Vatiquinone
