= List of Major League Baseball players suspended for domestic violence =

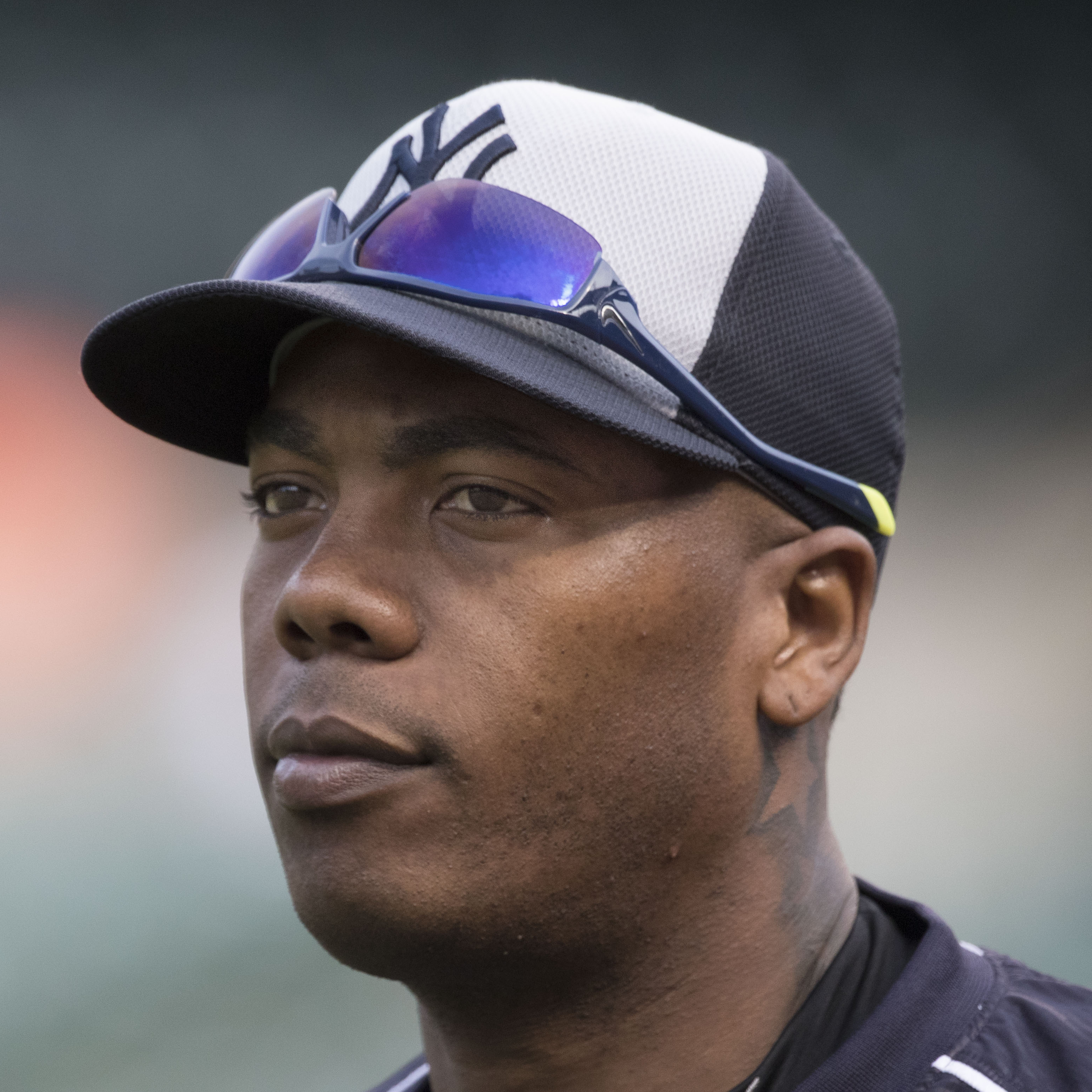
Aroldis Chapman was the first player suspended by Major League Baseball for domestic violence.

Major League Baseball (MLB) and the MLB Players Association (MLBPA) announced the creation of a domestic violence policy in August 2015. Officially, the domestic violence policy is included within the broader Joint Domestic Violence, Sexual Assault and Child Abuse Policy. According to the policy, the Commissioner can place any player suspected of domestic violence, sexual assault, or child abuse on administrative leave for up to seven days while conducting an investigation. The Commissioner can choose to suspend or reinstate the player, or can defer judgment until after criminal proceedings conclude. The policy does not include minimum or maximum punishments.

Under baseball's collectively bargained policy, players undergo mandatory domestic violence training once a year in spring training. MLB conscripted a San Francisco-based nonprofit, Futures Without Violence, to spearhead its training program. The nonprofit is also part of MLB’s joint committee on domestic violence, a collaboration between the players’ union and the commissioner’s office.

Prior to MLB's 2015 policy on domestic violence, no club took disciplinary action against a player accused of or arrested for domestic violence until the Boston Red Sox suspended Wil Cordero in 1997 following a domestic violence arrest. In March 2016, the league suspended Aroldis Chapman for 30 games following an alleged incident between Chapman and his girlfriend. He was the first player suspended by the league following the implementation of the league-wide policy.

== List of players suspended ==
Date	Refers to the date of the announcement of the suspension

Player	Team	Date	Length	Ref.
Wil Cordero	Boston Red Sox	July 4, 1997	8 games	
Julio Mateo	Seattle Mariners	May 6, 2007	10 games	
Aroldis Chapman	New York Yankees	March 1, 2016	30 games	
José Reyes	Colorado Rockies	May 13, 2016	51 games	
Héctor Olivera	Atlanta Braves	May 26, 2016	82 games	
Jeurys Familia	New York Mets	March 29, 2017	15 games	
Derek Norris	Free agent	September 1, 2017	Remainder of the season	
Steven Wright	Boston Red Sox	March 23, 2018	15 games	
José Torres	San Diego Padres	June 8, 2018	100 games	
Roberto Osuna	Toronto Blue Jays	June 22, 2018	75 games	
Addison Russell	Chicago Cubs	September 21, 2018	40 games	
Ji Hwan Bae	Pittsburgh Pirates	April, 2019	30 games	
Odúbel Herrera	Philadelphia Phillies	July 5, 2019	Remainder of the season (85 games)	
Julio Urías	Los Angeles Dodgers	August 17, 2019	20 games	
Domingo Germán	New York Yankees	January 2, 2020	81 games	
Sam Dyson	Free agent	March 5, 2021	Season (162 games)	
Marcell Ozuna	Atlanta Braves	November 29, 2021	20 games	
Trevor Bauer	Los Angeles Dodgers	April 29, 2022	324 games (reduced to 194 games)	
Carlos Martínez	Free agent	September 1, 2022	85 games	
Jimmy Cordero	New York Yankees	July 5, 2023	Remainder of the season (76 games)	
Julio Urías (2)	Free agent	March 21, 2025	112 days	

== See also ==
- List of Major League Baseball players suspended for performance-enhancing drugs
- List of suspensions in the National Football League
- List of people banned or suspended by the NBA
- List of people banned from Major League Baseball
