= Cody Stanley =

American baseball player (born 1988)

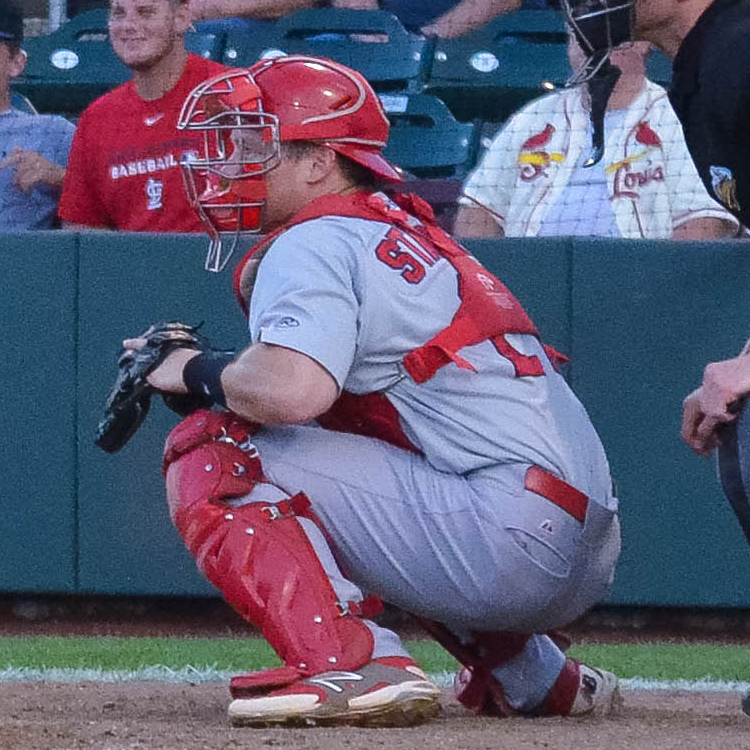
- Stanley playing for the Memphis Redbirds, triple-A affiliate of the St. Louis Cardinals, in 2015

Free agent
- Catcher
- Born: December 21, 1988 (age 37); Clinton, North Carolina, U.S.
- Batted: Left Threw: Right

MLB debut
- April 26, 2015, for the St. Louis Cardinals

Last appearance
- September 10, 2015, for the St. Louis Cardinals

MLB statistics
- Batting average: .400
- Home runs: 0
- Runs batted in: 3
- Stats at Baseball Reference

Teams
- St. Louis Cardinals (2015)

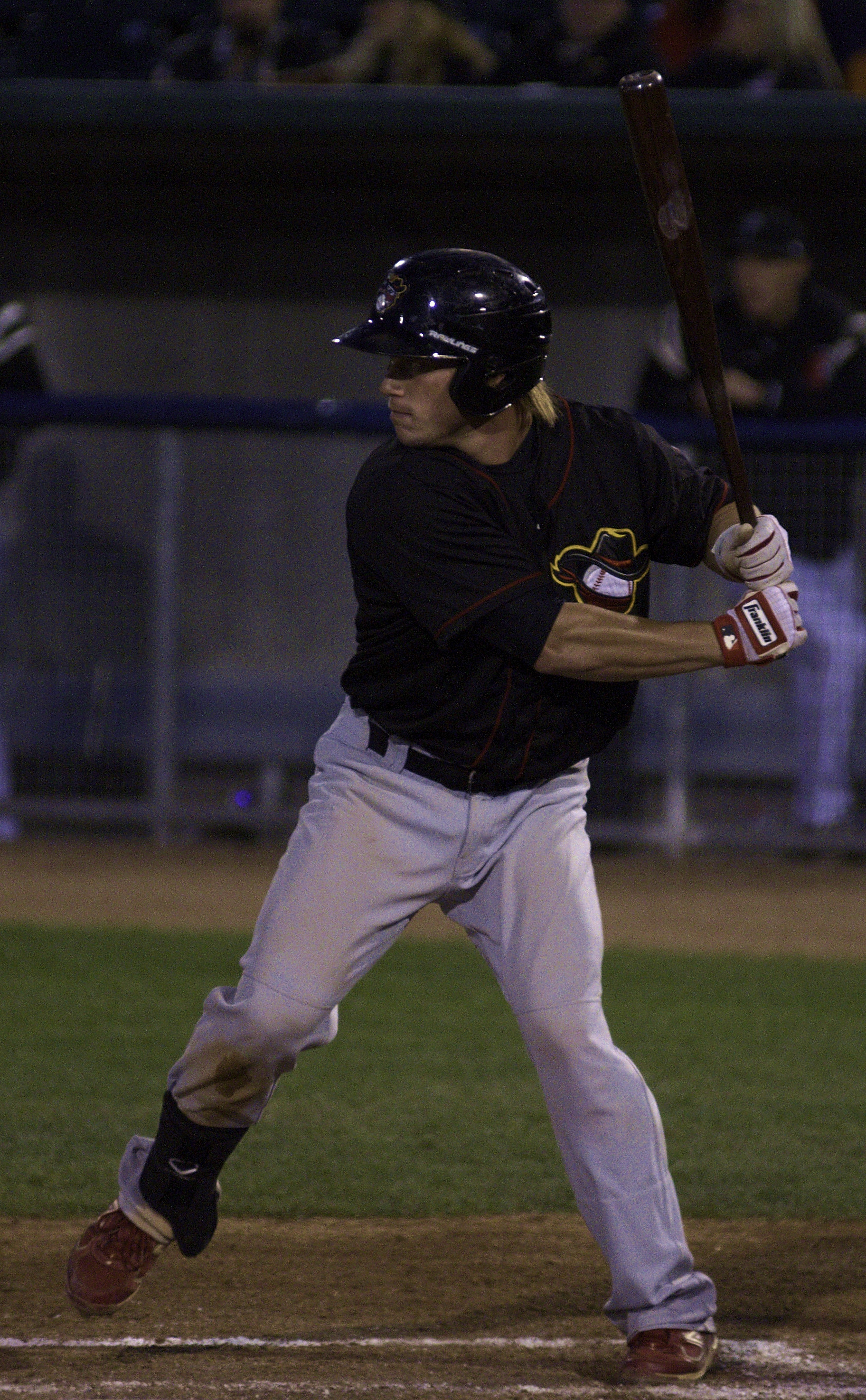
Stanley batting for the Quad Cities River Bandits, single-A affiliates of the Cardinals, in 2011

Cody Franklin Stanley (born December 21, 1988) is an American former Major League Baseball (MLB) catcher who played for the St. Louis Cardinals in 2015. Stanley was twice suspended during his professional playing career for violating Major League Baseball's drug policy.

== Amateur career ==
Stanley attended the University of North Carolina at Wilmington, and in 2009 he played collegiate summer baseball with the Cotuit Kettleers of the Cape Cod Baseball League where he was named a league all-star. The St. Louis Cardinals drafted Stanley in the fourth round of the 2010 Major League Baseball draft.

== Professional career ==
=== Minor leagues ===
Commencing his Minor League Baseball career with the Johnson City Cardinals in 2010, Stanley batted .321 and contributed to winning the Appalachian League title. He played for the Quad City River Bandits in 2011 and they won the Midwest League title. In 2012, Stanley was suspended 50 games after testing positive for methylhexanamine and tamoxifen, prohibited substances under Major League Baseball's drug policy. While playing for the double-A Springfield Cardinals in 2014, Stanley was Texas League All-Star Game Most Valuable Player (MVP) after hitting a home run.

=== Major leagues ===
The Cardinals added Stanley to the 40-man roster on November 19, 2014. He made his major league debut on April 26, 2015, in a 6–3 loss to the Milwaukee Brewers, and singled in his first at bat. Stanley spent most of the 2015 season with the triple-A Memphis Redbirds, batting .241 with seven home runs, 45 runs batted in (RBI) and a slugging percentage (SLG) of .359. He returned to the Cardinals in September when MLB rosters expanded and garnered four hits in ten at bats in his first major league season. On September 12, he was suspended 80 games after testing positive for 4-Chlorodehydromethyltestosterone, also known as Turinabol, a prohibited substance under MLB's drug policy. It was the second such suspension in his professional career. On December 2, 2015, the Cardinals elected not to tender him a contract for the following season, thereby making him a free agent.

Weeks before he was due to appeal, MLB announced in July 2016, that Stanley was suspended for 162 games for violating the league's drug policy a third time after again testing positive for Turinabol, before he had completed his second suspension.

=== Sugar Land Skeeters ===
On February 7, 2019, after several years out of professional baseball, Stanley signed with the Sugar Land Skeeters of the independent Atlantic League of Professional Baseball. He became a free agent following the season.

== See also ==
- List of Major League Baseball players suspended for performance-enhancing drugs
