= Cypionic acid =

Names
- Preferred IUPAC name 3-Cyclopentylpropanoic acid
- Other names 3-Cyclopentylpropionic acid; 3-Cyclopentanepropionic acid; Cypionate; Cipionate

Identifiers
CAS Number	140-77-2
3D model (JSmol)	Interactive image
ChemSpider	8487
ECHA InfoCard	100.004.940
PubChem CID	8818
UNII	931H8F0JEE
CompTox Dashboard (EPA)	DTXSID4059700
- InChI: InChI=1S/C8H14O2/c9-8(10)6-5-7-3-1-2-4-7/h7H,1-6H2,(H,9,10) Key: ZRPLANDPDWYOMZ-UHFFFAOYSA-N; InChI=1/C8H14O2/c9-8(10)6-5-7-3-1-2-4-7/h7H,1-6H2,(H,9,10) Key: ZRPLANDPDWYOMZ-UHFFFAOYAK
- SMILES: O=C(O)CCC1CCCC1

Properties
Chemical formula	C_{8}H_{14}O_{2}
Molar mass	142.198 g·mol^{−1}
Appearance	Liquid
Density	0.996 g/mL
Melting point	12 °C (54 °F; 285 K)
Boiling point	130 to 133 @12mmHg

Hazards
Flash point	122 ± 9.8 °C
- Except where otherwise noted, data are given for materials in their standard state (at 25 °C [77 °F], 100 kPa). Infobox references

Cypionic acid, also known as cyclopentylpropionic acid, is an aliphatic carboxylic acid with the molecular formula C_{8}H_{14}O_{2}. Its salts and esters are known as cypionates or cipionates. The name comes from a contraction: cyclopentylpropionic.

The primary use of cypionic acid is in pharmaceutical formulations. Cypionic acid is used to prepare ester prodrugs which have increased half-lives relative to the parent compound. The lipophilicity of the cypionate group allows the prodrug to be sequestered in fat depots after intramuscular injection. The ester group is slowly hydrolyzed by metabolic enzymes, releasing steady doses of the active ingredient. Examples include testosterone cypionate, estradiol cypionate, hydrocortisone cypionate, oxabolone cipionate, and mesterolone cypionate.
