= Oxabolone cipionate =

Chemical compound

Clinical data
- Trade names: Steranabol Depo, Steranabol Ritardo
- Other names: Oxabolone cypionate; FI-5852; 4-Hydroxy-19-nortestosterone 17β-cypionate; Estr-4-en-4,17β-diol-3-one 17β-cypionate
- Routes of administration: Intramuscular injection
- Drug class: Androgen; Anabolic steroid; Androgen ester
- ATC code: A14AB03 (WHO)

Identifiers
- IUPAC name: [(8R,9S,10R,13S,14S,17S)-4-hydroxy-13-methyl-3-oxo-2,6,7,8,9,10,11,12,14,15,16,17-dodecahydro-1H-cyclopenta[a]phenanthren-17-yl]-3-cyclopentylpropanoate
- CAS Number: 1254-35-9
- PubChem CID: 68952
- DrugBank: DB13185
- ChemSpider: 62175
- UNII: 5RXY50Q01N
- KEGG: D01149
- ChEBI: CHEBI:31940
- ChEMBL: ChEMBL2105318
- CompTox Dashboard (EPA): DTXSID3046879
- ECHA InfoCard: 100.013.647

Chemical and physical data
- Formula: C_{26}H_{38}O_{4}
- Molar mass: 414.586 g·mol^{−1}
- 3D model (JSmol): Interactive image
- SMILES: C[C@]12CC[C@H]3[C@H]([C@@H]1CC[C@@H]2OC(=O)CCC4CCCC4)CCC5=C(C(=O)CC[C@H]35)O
- InChI: InChI=1S/C26H38O4/c1-26-15-14-18-17-9-11-22(27)25(29)20(17)8-7-19(18)21(26)10-12-23(26)30-24(28)13-6-16-4-2-3-5-16/h16-19,21,23,29H,2-15H2,1H3/t17-,18-,19-,21+,23+,26+/m1/s1; Key:KHKDIUPVDIEHAH-KXLSUQFWSA-N

Oxabolone cipionate (INN, JAN) (brand names Steranabol Depo, Steranabol Ritardo; former developmental code name FI-5852), or oxabolone cypionate, also known as 4-hydroxy-19-nortestosterone 17β-cypionate or estr-4-en-4,17β-diol-3-one 17β-cypionate, is synthetic and injected anabolic–androgenic steroid (AAS) and derivative of nandrolone (19-nortestosterone) which has been marketed in Europe. It is the C17β cypionate ester and a prodrug of oxabolone (4-hydroxy-19-nortestosterone).

== See also ==
- 4-Hydroxytestosterone
- Clostebol (4-chlorotestosterone)
- Formestane (4-hydroxyandrostenedione)
- Norclostebol (4-chloro-19-nortestosterone)
