= Mesterolone cipionate =

Steroid

Clinical data
- Other names: Mesterolone cypionate; Mesterolone cyclopentylpropionate; Mesterolone cyclopentanepropionate
- Routes of administration: Intramuscular injection
- Drug class: Androgen; Anabolic steroid; Androgen ester

Identifiers
- IUPAC name: [(1S,5S,8R,9S,10S,13S,14S,17S)-1,10,13-trimethyl-3-oxo-1,2,4,5,6,7,8,9,11,12,14,15,16,17-tetradecahydrocyclopenta[a]phenanthren-17-yl] 3-cyclopentylpropanoate
- PubChem CID: 165360247
- ChemSpider: 129562413

Chemical and physical data
- Formula: C_{29}H_{46}O_{3}
- Molar mass: 442.684 g·mol^{−1}
- 3D model (JSmol): Interactive image
- SMILES: [H][C@@]12CC[C@H](OC(=O)CCC3CCCC3)[C@@]1(C)CC[C@@]1([H])[C@@]2([H])CC[C@@]2(C)CC(=O)C[C@H](C)[C@]12C
- InChI: InChI=1S/C29H46O3/c1-19-17-21(30)18-27(2)15-13-22-23-10-11-25(28(23,3)16-14-24(22)29(19,27)4)32-26(31)12-9-20-7-5-6-8-20/h19-20,22-25H,5-18H2,1-4H3/t19-,22-,23-,24-,25-,27-,28-,29+/m0/s1; Key:FVSDWMPQSHRUBR-GKMDBBAJSA-N

Mesterolone cipionate is a synthetic anabolic–androgenic steroid and an androgen ester – specifically, the C17β cypionate ester of mesterolone – which was never marketed. It is administered via intramuscular injection once every two weeks and acts as a long-acting prodrug of mesterolone. The drug was studied in the treatment of depression in men along with mesterolone in the mid-1970s but was never introduced for medical use.

== See also ==
- List of androgen esters
