= Clostebol =

Anabolic steroid

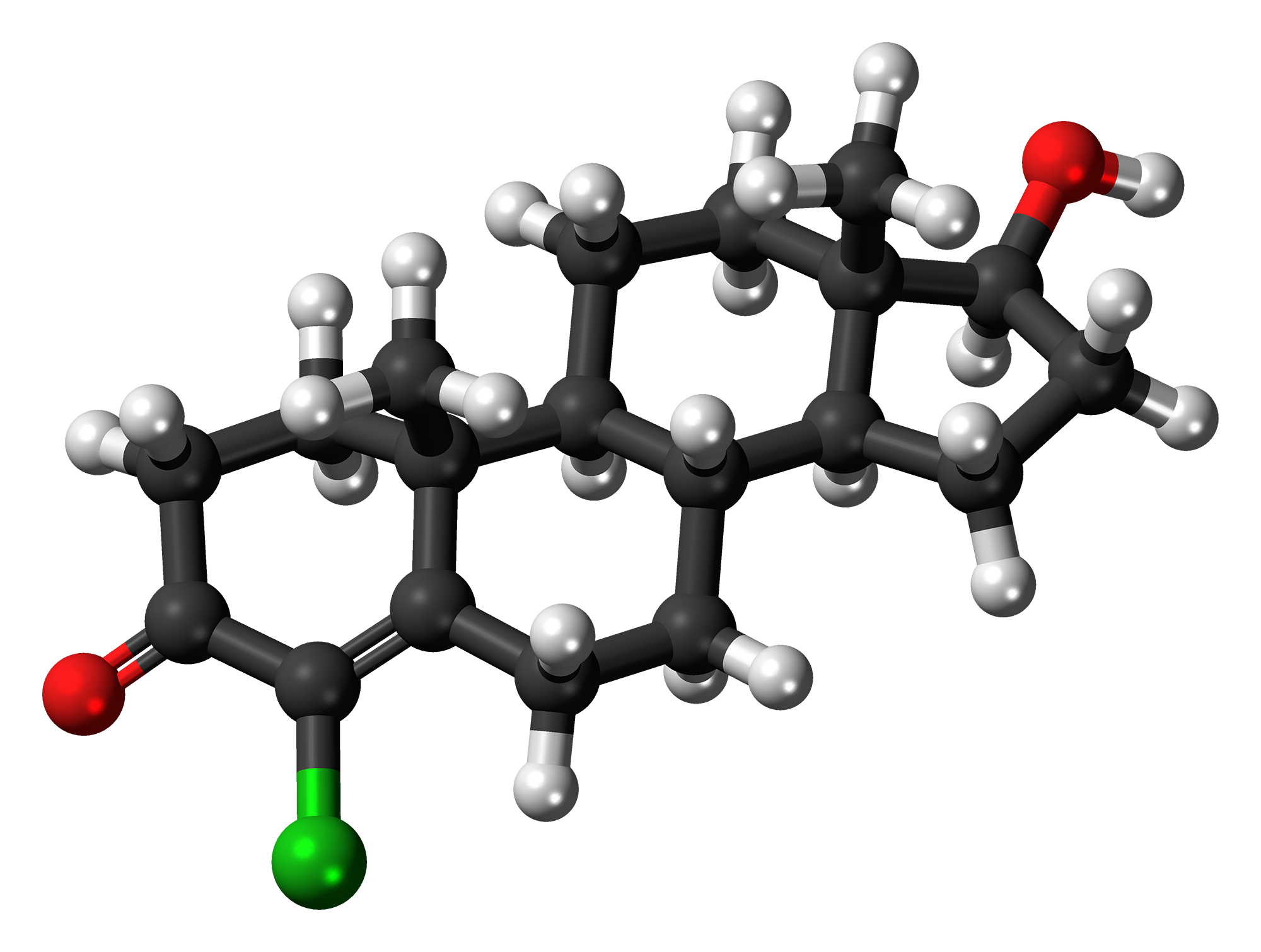

Clinical data
- Other names: Chlorotestosterone; 4-Chlorotestosterone; 4-Chloroandrost-4-en-17β-ol-3-one
- Drug class: Androgen; Anabolic steroid
- ATC code: None

Legal status
- Legal status: BR: Class C5 (Anabolic steroids); CA: Schedule IV

Identifiers
- IUPAC name: (8S,9S,10R,13S,14S,17S)-4-Chloro-17-hydroxy-10,13-dimethyl-1,2,6,7,8,9,11,12,14,15,16,17-dodecahydrocyclopenta[a]phenanthren-3-one
- CAS Number: 1093-58-9
- PubChem CID: 68947
- DrugBank: DB01521
- ChemSpider: 62171
- UNII: Z7D4G976SH
- KEGG: D07731
- ChEMBL: ChEMBL2106571
- CompTox Dashboard (EPA): DTXSID5046192
- ECHA InfoCard: 100.012.849

Chemical and physical data
- Formula: C_{19}H_{27}ClO_{2}
- Molar mass: 322.87 g·mol^{−1}
- 3D model (JSmol): Interactive image
- SMILES: O=C4C(\Cl)=C2/[C@]([C@H]1CC[C@@]3([C@@H](O)CC[C@H]3[C@@H]1CC2)C)(C)CC4
- InChI: InChI=1S/C19H27ClO2/c1-18-10-8-15(21)17(20)14(18)4-3-11-12-5-6-16(22)19(12,2)9-7-13(11)18/h11-13,16,22H,3-10H2,1-2H3/t11-,12-,13-,16-,18+,19-/m0/s1; Key:KCZCIYZKSLLNNH-FBPKJDBXSA-N

Clostebol (INN; also known as 4-chlorotestosterone) is a synthetic anabolic–androgenic steroid (AAS). Clostebol is the 4-chloro derivative of the natural hormone testosterone. The chlorination prevents conversion to dihydrotestosterone (DHT) while also rendering the chemical incapable of conversion to estrogen. Although usually used as an ester including clostebol acetate (Macrobin, Steranabol, Alfa-Trofodermin, Megagrisevit), clostebol caproate (Macrobin-Depot), or clostebol propionate (Yonchlon), unmodified/non-esterified clostebol is also reported to be marketed, under the brand name Trofodermin-S in Mexico.

Clostebol is a weak AAS with potential use as a performance enhancing drug. It is currently banned by the World Anti-Doping Agency. Chlorodehydromethyltestosterone (Oral Turinabol), combining the chemical structures of clostebol and metandienone, was widely used in the East German state-sponsored doping program.

== Medical uses ==
Clostebol acetate ointment has ophthalmological and dermatological use. In some countries, such as Italy, it is available without a prescription as a topical cream or spray for the treatment of (infected) skin wounds such as abrasions, erosions, fissures, burns and to help speed up the healing of the area.

In Italy, it is sold as a spray and cream, with the brand name Trofodermin, containing a combination of clostebol acetate and neomycin.

== Chemistry ==
Clostebol, also known as 4-chlorotestosterone or as 4-chloroandrost-4-en-17β-ol-3-one, is a synthetic androstane steroid and a derivative of testosterone. It is specifically the 4-chlorinated derivative of testosterone.

== Society and culture ==
=== Nutritional supplements ===
A related anabolic steroid, methylclostebol, is a common additive in so-called dietary supplements, generally listed in the convoluted form 4-chloro-17α-methyl-androst-4-en-17β-ol-3-one.

=== Publicized abuse or contamination cases ===
Use of clostebol has led to the suspension of a number of athletes in various sports including Freddy Galvis of the Philadelphia Phillies in 2012, Dee Gordon of the Miami Marlins in 2016, Olympic athlete Viktoria Orsi Toth in 2016, Serie A soccer player José Luis Palomino of Club Atlanta, and Orlando Galo from C.S. Herediano in 2022.

In 2016, urinalysis resulted in Therese Johaug testing positive for clostebol.

Italian tennis player Jannik Sinner tested positive for clostebol in two different urine samples on 8 March and 10 March 2024. The International Tennis Integrity Agency (ITIA) found Sinner was inadvertently contaminated with the substance by his physiotherapist who had been applying the healing spray Trofodermin, available over-the counter in Italy, to treat a cut on his own hand and had then carried out treatments on Sinner. Sinner was stripped of $325,000 in prize money and 400 ranking points earned at the Indian Wells Open, but wasn't suspended initially because an independent tribunal ruled that it was not intentional. However, the World Anti-Doping Agency (WADA) announced in February 2025 they entered a "case resolution agreement" with Sinner. WADA accepted the cause and explanation of the positive test but stated "an athlete bears responsibility for the entourage’s negligence". A three-month suspension was handed down with Sinner being ineligible from tennis competition from 9 February to 4 May 2025.

=== Regulation ===
In the U.S., clostebol is listed as a Schedule III controlled substance, meaning the U.S. federal government considers it to have a potential for abuse as well as a currently accepted medical use.

== See also ==
- Chlorodehydromethyltestosterone
- Methylclostebol
