= Oxabolone =

Chemical compound

Clinical data
- Other names: 4-Hydroxy-19-nortestosterone; 4,17β-Dihydroxyestr-4-en-3-one; 19-Norandrost-4-ene-4,17β-diol-3-one
- Routes of administration: Intramuscular injection (as oxabolone cipionate)
- Drug class: Androgen; Anabolic steroid

Identifiers
- IUPAC name: (8R,9S,10R,13S,14S,17S)-4,17-dihydroxy-13-methyl-2,6,7,8,9,10,11,12,14,15,16,17-dodecahydro-1H-cyclopenta[a]phenanthren-3-one
- CAS Number: 4721-69-1
- DrugBank: DB01500
- ChemSpider: 16736429
- UNII: 51RPF719WE
- CompTox Dashboard (EPA): DTXSID50878357
- ECHA InfoCard: 100.022.920

Chemical and physical data
- Formula: C_{18}H_{26}O_{3}
- Molar mass: 290.403 g·mol^{−1}
- 3D model (JSmol): Interactive image
- SMILES: O=C4CC[C@H]3C(/CC[C@@H]1[C@@H]3CC[C@]2(C)[C@@H](O)CC[C@@H]12)=C4/O
- InChI: InChI=1S/C18H26O3/c1-18-9-8-11-10-4-6-15(19)17(21)13(10)3-2-12(11)14(18)5-7-16(18)20/h10-12,14,16,20-21H,2-9H2,1H3/t10-,11-,12-,14+,16+,18+/m1/s1; Key:GXHBCWCMYVTJOW-YGRHGMIBSA-N

Oxabolone is a synthetic anabolic-androgenic steroid (AAS) of the nandrolone (19-nortestosterone) group which was never marketed. It can be formulated as the cipionate ester prodrug oxabolone cipionate, which, in contrast, has been marketed for medical use.

Oxabolone is on the World Anti-Doping Agency's list of prohibited substances, and is therefore banned from use in most major sports.

The 17α-methylated analogue of oxabolone is methylhydroxynandrolone (4-hydroxy-17α-methyl-19-nortestosterone) and the 17α- and 19-methylated derivative of oxabolone is oxymesterone (4-hydroxy-17α-methyltestosterone).
