= Norclostebol =

Chemical compound

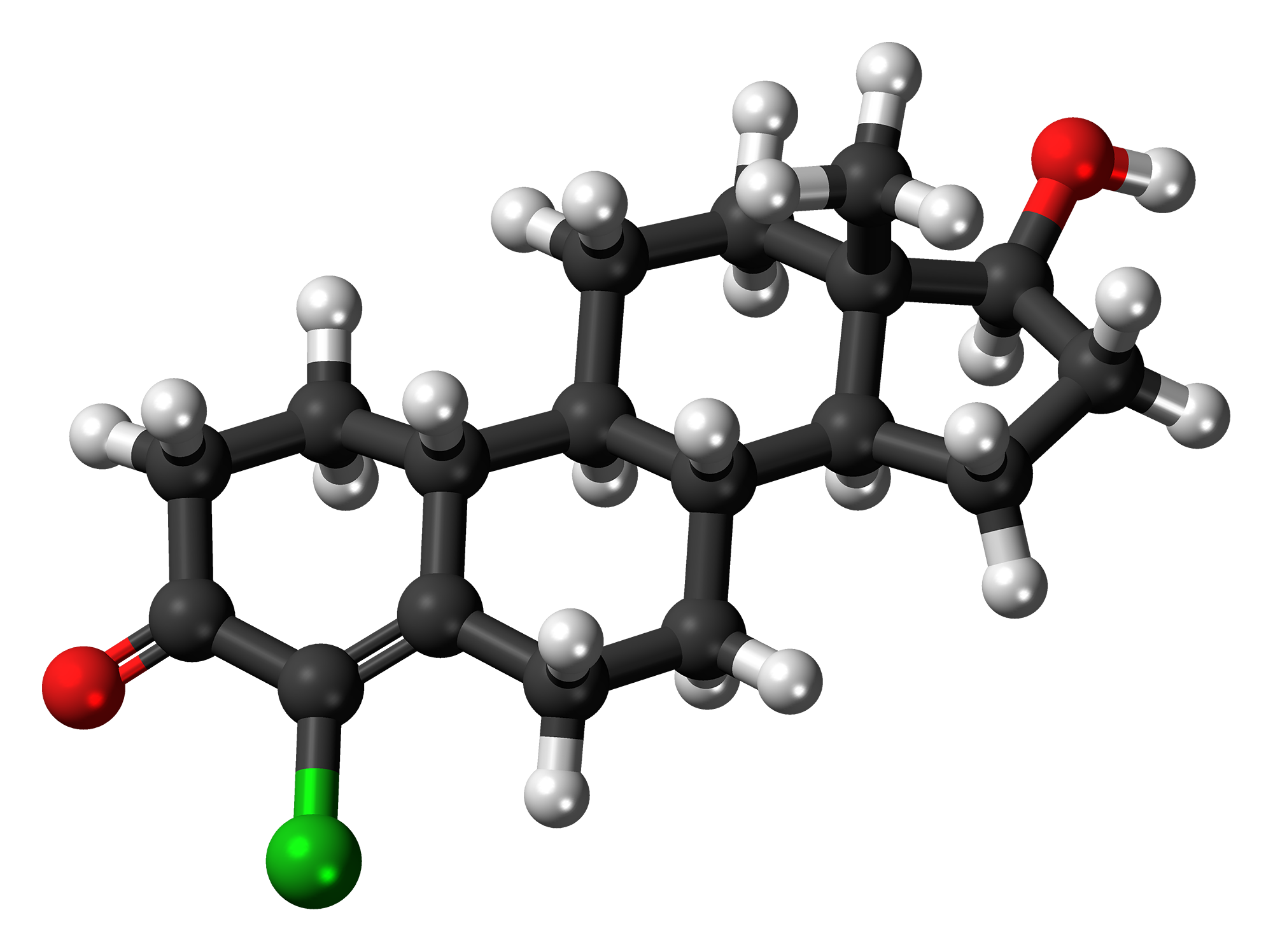

Clinical data
- Trade names: Lentabol
- Other names: SKF-6611; CP-73; 4-Chloroestr-4-en-17β-ol-3-one

Identifiers
- IUPAC name: (8R,9S,10R,13S,14S,17S)-4-Chloro-17-hydroxy-13-methyl-2,6,7,8,9,10,11,12,14,15,16,17-dodecahydro-1H-cyclopenta[a]phenanthren-3-one
- CAS Number: 13583-21-6
- PubChem CID: 166576
- ChemSpider: 145769
- UNII: VI1001O2DI
- CompTox Dashboard (EPA): DTXSID401016377

Chemical and physical data
- Formula: C_{18}H_{25}ClO_{2}
- Molar mass: 308.85 g·mol^{−1}
- 3D model (JSmol): Interactive image
- SMILES: C[C@]12CC[C@H]3[C@H]([C@@H]1CC[C@@H]2O)CCC4=C(C(=O)CC[C@H]34)Cl
- InChI: InChI=1S/C18H25ClO2/c1-18-9-8-11-10-4-6-15(20)17(19)13(10)3-2-12(11)14(18)5-7-16(18)21/h10-12,14,16,21H,2-9H2,1H3/t10-,11-,12-,14+,16+,18+/m1/s1; Key:OZDDFAQVVGFDJP-YGRHGMIBSA-N

Norclostebol (INN; brand name Lentabol; former developmental code names SKF-6611, CP-73) is a synthetic androgen and anabolic steroid (AAS) that was derived from nandrolone. It was described in the literature in 1957. Norclostebol is also used as an ester, norclostebol acetate (brand name Anabol 4-19).

Norclostebol is a 4-chloro derivative of testosterone. It works out to be significantly stronger than pure testosterone. It is approximately 6.6 times as anabolic while only 40% as androgenic. This may not be a particularly fair or valid comparison however. It is more appropriate to compare norclostebol to testosterone propionate due to the use of an ester. In this case they are fairly even in anabolic potency at 112% but only 20–25% as androgenic. In practice this means norclostebol is a potent anabolic compound with minimal tendency towards side effects.
