= Jesús Montero =

Venezuelan baseball player (1989–2025)

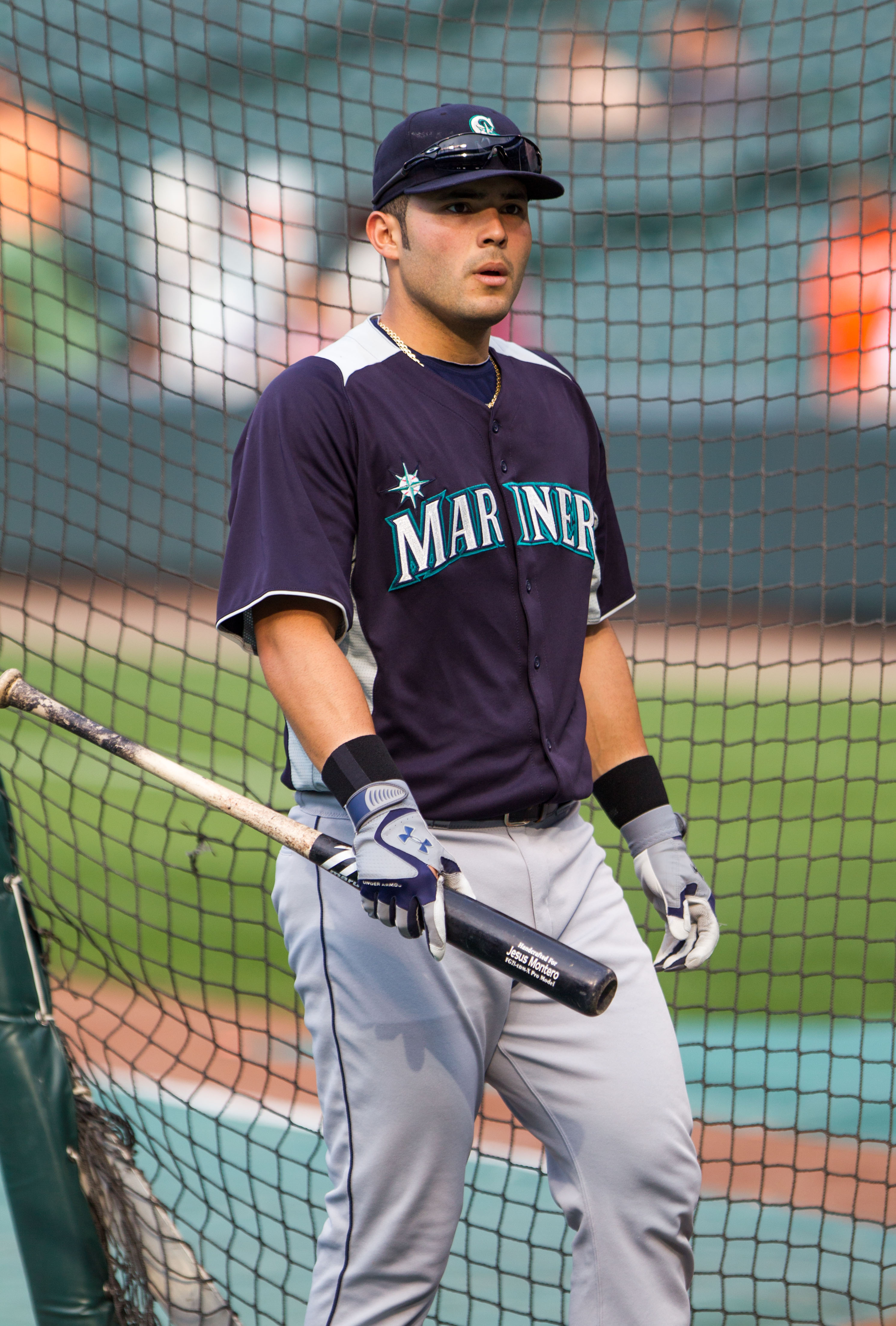
- Montero with the Seattle Mariners in 2012
- Catcher / First baseman
- Born: November 28, 1989; Guacara, Venezuela
- Died: October 19, 2025 (aged 35); Valencia, Venezuela
- Batted: Right Threw: Right

MLB debut
- September 1, 2011, for the New York Yankees

Last MLB appearance
- October 3, 2015, for the Seattle Mariners

MLB statistics
- Batting average: .253
- Home runs: 28
- Runs batted in: 104
- Stats at Baseball Reference

Teams
- New York Yankees (2011); Seattle Mariners (2012–2015)

Jesús Alejandro Montero López (November 28, 1989 – October 19, 2025) was a Venezuelan professional baseball catcher and first baseman. He played in Major League Baseball (MLB) for the New York Yankees and Seattle Mariners from 2011 to 2015.

Signed by the Yankees in 2006, Montero became one of the best prospects in baseball. He debuted in MLB with the Yankees during the 2011 season and was traded to the Mariners for Michael Pineda following that season. After his rookie year in 2012, Montero struggled with the Mariners in 2013 before ending his season with a 50-game suspension for his involvement in the Biogenesis scandal. He spent most of the 2014 and 2015 seasons in the minor leagues. He played in his last major league game on October 3, 2015, for the Mariners. Montero was signed by the Toronto Blue Jays in 2016 and the Baltimore Orioles in 2017 but spent his time on their minor league teams. He signed with two Mexican League teams, Sultanes de Monterrey in 2017 and Generales de Durango in 2018, but was released from both teams.

Montero died after he was involved in a motorcycle collision near Valencia, Venezuela, on October 19, 2025.

== Professional career ==
=== Minor leagues ===
On July 2, 2006, Montero, an amateur free agent, signed a professional contract with the New York Yankees of Major League Baseball (MLB), receiving a $1.6 million signing bonus. Baseball America considered Montero to be the best player available and the best power hitter in the 2006 international free agent class. In 2007, at age 17, Montero made his professional debut in Minor League Baseball for the Gulf Coast Yankees of the Rookie-level Gulf Coast League. As a result of his performance, the Yankees invited Montero to spring training in 2008, where he hit a home run in his only at bat before being assigned to minor league camp. He spent the 2008 season with the Charleston RiverDogs of the Single-A South Atlantic League, where he batted .326 with 17 home runs and 87 runs batted in (RBIs), with two stolen bases. Montero was named to the All-Star Futures Game, which features baseball's best minor league prospects. Baseball America rated him as the Yankees' second best prospect and best power hitter after the 2008 season.

Montero began the 2009 season with the Tampa Yankees, the High-A Florida State League affiliate of the Yankees. On June 3, 2009, the Yankees promoted Montero to the Trenton Thunder of the Double-A Eastern League. He hit .317 with nine home runs and 33 RBIs in 44 games with the Thunder. Despite having played only a portion of the 2009 season in Trenton, Montero was added to the Eastern League All-Star roster. Baseball America ranked Montero as the third-best prospect in baseball at midseason in 2009. He was named to appear in the All-Star Futures Game for the second year in a row. Montero's season ended prematurely when he sustained a broken finger while catching.

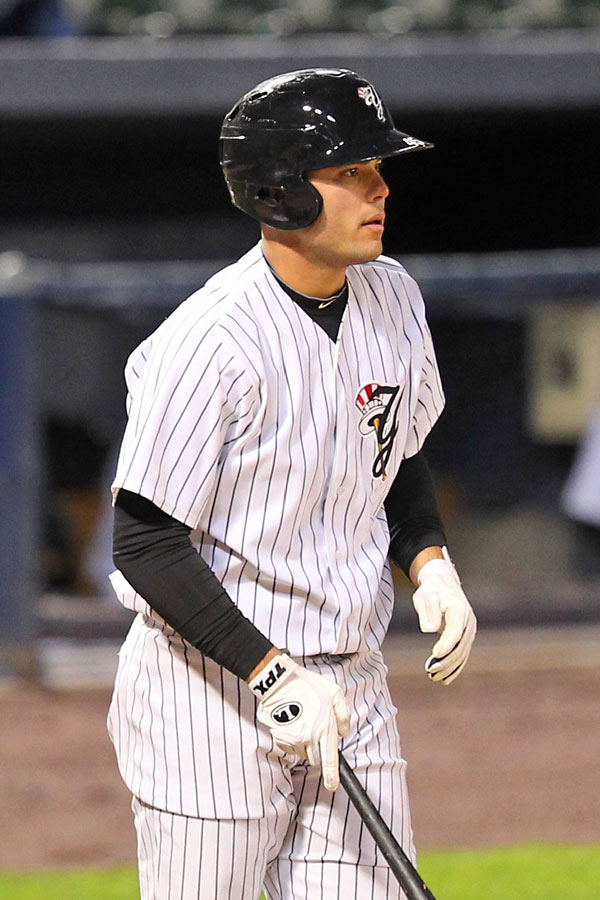
Montero with the Scranton/Wilkes-Barre Yankees in 2010

At the start of the 2010 season, Baseball America ranked Montero as the Yankees' best prospect, and as the fourth-best prospect in all of baseball. The Yankees invited Montero to spring training, where Yankees' hitting coach Kevin Long declared him ready for the majors as a hitter, though the team wanted to see improvement on defense. Montero spent the 2010 season with the Scranton/Wilkes-Barre Yankees of the Triple-A International League. Early in the season, Montero struggled, but he improved after the All-Star break. Montero admitted that he did not spend as much time practicing in the batting cage as he should, and that Alex Rodriguez started fining Montero $100 for every day he didn't work out in the cage.

At the 2010 MLB trade deadline, the Yankees and Seattle Mariners almost completed a deal that would have sent Montero, Zach McAllister, and David Adams to the Mariners in exchange for Cliff Lee. When the teams shared medical reports, the Mariners were concerned by Adams' ankle injury. As a result, they chose to trade Lee to the Texas Rangers in a package centered around Justin Smoak.

Montero was named to appear in the International League All-Star game He finished the season with a .289 batting average, 21 home runs, and 75 RBIs in 123 games. Montero was honored on the International League's Postseason All-Star team, and was chosen as the Scranton/Wilkes-Barre Player of the Year.

Baseball America rated Montero as the third-best prospect in baseball before the 2011 season. Montero contended for a spot on the Yankees' 25-man roster in spring training in 2011. Yankees officials believed Montero was ready to be the starting catcher, which would have enabled Jorge Posada to shift to designated hitter, though the signing of Russell Martin allowed the Yankees to be patient with Montero. A spring training injury to Francisco Cervelli gave the Yankees an opportunity to use Montero as Martin's backup, but Montero performed poorly with the pressure, and the team decided it was best for Montero to play every day in the minor leagues, rather than two games a week in the majors. Montero began the 2011 season in Scranton/Wilkes-Barre. Montero batted .288 with 18 home runs and 67 RBIs for Scranton/Wilkes-Barre on the season.

=== New York Yankees (2011) ===
The Yankees promoted Montero to the major leagues on September 1, 2011, as a September call-up. He started his first major league game that night as the designated hitter against the Boston Red Sox at Fenway Park. Montero went 0-for-4 but was hit by a pitch and scored the go-ahead run in the seventh inning. He made his first start at Yankee Stadium on September 3, against the Toronto Blue Jays. He went 1-for-3, hitting a single to left field in the sixth inning with two outs for his first major league hit. On September 5, during a game against the Baltimore Orioles, Montero hit his first two home runs of his major league career and the Yankees took an 11–10 victory.

Montero became the first 21-year-old rookie to hit two home runs in one of his first five games since Manny Ramirez in 1993. Montero started his first game as a catcher against the Los Angeles Angels of Anaheim on September 11. Against the Red Sox on September 24, Montero fell a triple short of hitting for the cycle. Montero ended the year with a .328 batting average, which included four home runs and 28 RBIs in 18 games.

=== Seattle Mariners (2012–2015) ===
During the 2011–12 off season, the Yankees traded Montero with Héctor Noesí for Michael Pineda and José Campos. The Mariners had finished last in runs scored in the past two years and their need for a right-handed power hitter led them to trade Pineda from their depth of top-tier pitching prospects. Yankees' General Manager Brian Cashman said that Montero "may well be the best player I’ve ever traded".

==== 2012 season ====
Baseball America ranked Montero as the sixth-best prospect in baseball before the 2012 season. Montero made the Mariners' Opening Day roster in 2012. During the season, the Mariners split his playing time between catcher and designated hitter, and he appeared in a total of 135 games. Despite the high expectations he established with the Yankees in 2011, he was not an MLB Rookie of the Year Award finalist. He finished the 2012 season with a .260 batting average, 15 home runs, and 62 RBIs.

==== 2013 season ====
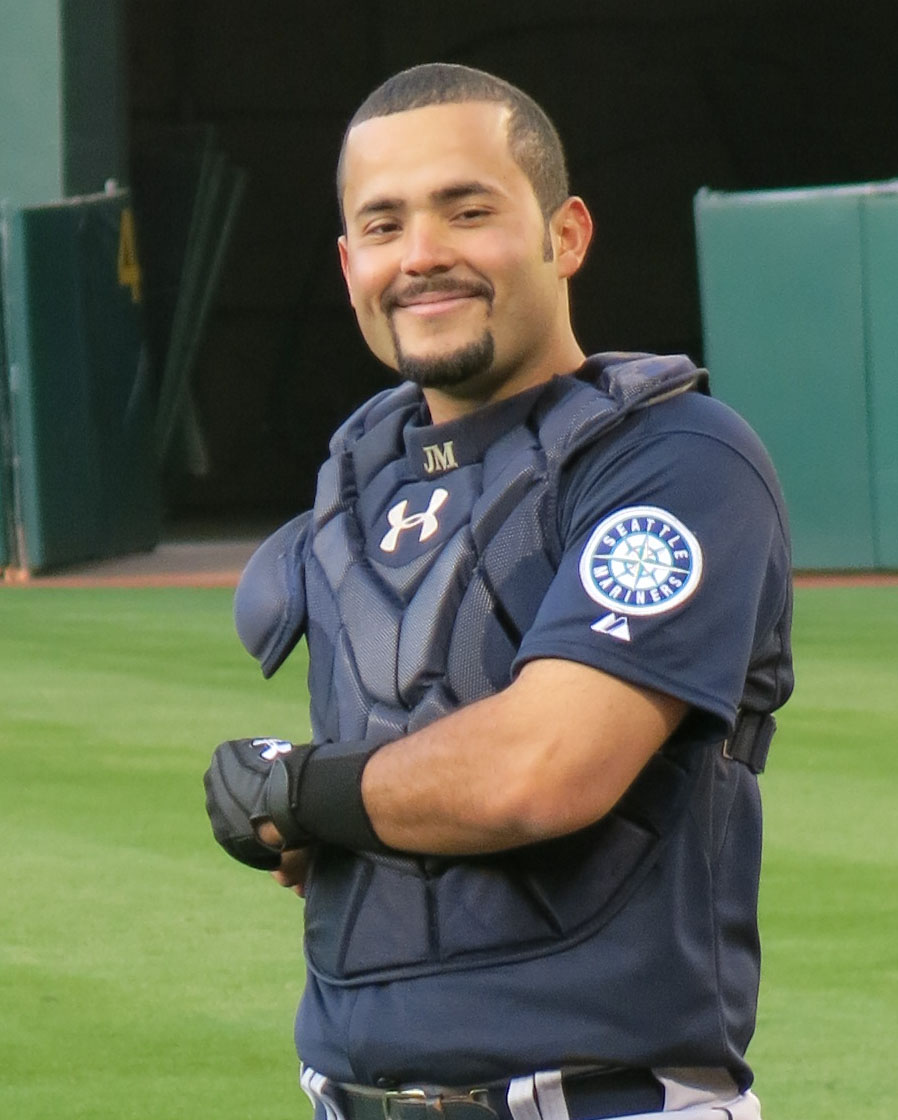
Montero with the Seattle Mariners in 2013

Montero began his 2013 season slowly, with a .208 batting average, three home runs, and nine RBIs in his first 29 games. He was demoted to the Tacoma Rainiers of the Triple-A Pacific Coast League on May 23. As he struggled throwing out baserunners attempting stolen bases, the Mariners played Montero as a first baseman for the first time in his professional career. He struggled offensively with Tacoma, batting .247 with one home run and nine RBIs.

On June 1, it was announced that Montero had sustained a torn meniscus in his left knee. Needing surgery to repair it, Montero was ruled out of any active competition for a period of four to six weeks. On August 5, Montero accepted a 50-game suspension for his involvement in the Biogenesis scandal, by which the Biogenesis of America clinic supplied performance-enhancing drugs to MLB players. After the regular season, Montero returned to Venezuela to play in the Venezuelan Professional Baseball League (VPBL). A hand injury that occurred while in a car accident ended his participation in the VPBL for the season.

==== 2014 season ====
Montero showed up for 2014 spring training weighing 275 pounds (125 kg), 40 pounds (18 kg) above his target weight. He said, "After winter ball, all I did was eat." Mariners' general manager Jack Zduriencik said he has "zero expectations" about Montero. He was cut from spring training camp in mid-March and spent much of the season in the minor leagues. He batted .286 in 97 games for Tacoma, hitting 16 home runs with 74 RBIs. He suffered an oblique strain late in the season, and while on the disabled list, played for the Everett AquaSox of the Class A-Short Season Northwest League on a rehab assignment.

In an August game against the Boise Hawks, Montero was involved in an altercation with roving instructor Butch Baccala. As Montero, serving as the first base coach for the AquaSox, left the field at the conclusion of an inning, Baccala heckled him from the stands, telling Montero to leave the field in a timely manner. Baccala then sent an ice cream sandwich to the dugout for Montero. Montero was not happy to be reminded of his earlier weight problem. He grabbed a bat, found Baccala in the stands, and threw the sandwich at Baccala while yelling expletives. The Mariners organization barred Montero from playing the rest of the 2014 season for this incident. Zduriencik stated:

First off, it is clear that both Jesus Montero and Butch Baccala engaged in behavior that is far below what we expect from members of our organization, including bad judgment at nearly every stage of this incident. I want to apologize on behalf of the Mariners franchise to the Boise Hawks and their fans. We recognize that fans, including children, were impacted by this incident, and the language that was used. We recognize the severity of this incident, and want to assure the Hawks and their fans that it will be dealt with appropriately.

==== 2015 season ====
Montero trained in Peoria, Arizona over the offseason, rather than returning to Venezuela. He reported to spring training in 2015 at 230 pounds (100 kg), and apologized for the incident in Boise. The Mariners optioned him to Tacoma two weeks before the beginning of the season to continue to receive regular at bats. While with Tacoma, the team's coaches noted that Montero's defense at first base had improved, to the point where Cory Snyder opined that Montero could play the position in the majors. After Montero batted .332 with 15 home runs and 68 RBIs in 84 games for Tacoma, the Mariners promoted him to the major leagues on July 9. He batted 3-for-10 while drawing three walks in five games before he was optioned back to Tacoma on July 19.

The Mariners recalled Montero on July 31, after trading several players at the MLB trade deadline. Though he began by batting 13-for-40 (.325) with the Mariners, his batting average fell to .200 by September as he fell into a 2-for-35 (.057) slump. The Mariners optioned Montero to Tacoma on September 2, despite there only being six games left in Tacoma's season. He finished the season with a .355 average in 98 games for Tacoma, but a .223 average with 32 strikeouts in 116 plate appearances for the Mariners.

After the 2015 season, the Mariners acquired Adam Lind, a left-handed hitter, as their starting first baseman. In spring training in 2016, Montero competed with Stefen Romero and Dae-ho Lee to be the right-handed hitting complement to Lind.

=== Toronto Blue Jays ===
On March 27, 2016, Montero was designated for assignment by the Mariners, and the following day, was claimed by the Toronto Blue Jays off of waivers. The Blue Jays assigned Montero to the Buffalo Bisons of the International League on April 1, outrighting him off of their 40-man roster. In 126 games for the Triple-A Buffalo Bisons, Montero slashed .317/.349/.438 with 11 home runs and 60 RBIs, and was named an International League post-season All Star. He was also named to appear in the Triple-A All-Star Game.

After the conclusion of the regular season, Montero was suspended for 50 games for testing positive for dimethylbutylamine, a banned substance. He elected free agency on November 7.

=== Baltimore Orioles ===
On January 3, 2017, Montero agreed to a minor league contract with the Baltimore Orioles. After serving his suspension, he made his season debut for the Norfolk Tides of the International League after he was activated on May 31. After batting .143 with 14 strikeouts in 49 at bats, the Orioles released Montero on June 27.

=== Sultanes de Monterrey ===
On July 11, 2017, Montero signed with the Sultanes de Monterrey of the Mexican League. In 21 appearances for the Sultanes, he slashed .349/.406/.446 with one home run and 17 RBI. Montero was released before the start of the ensuing season on January 23, 2018.

=== Generales de Durango ===
On February 15, 2018, he signed with the Generales de Durango of the Mexican League. In 27 games for Durango, he hit .273/.349/.382 with two home runs and 16 RBI. Montero was released by the Generales on April 24. He played for two teams in the Venezuelan Winter League 2018–2019 season. He played for Aguilas del Zulia during the 2019–2020 and 2020–2021 seasons.

== Personal life and death ==
Montero had two children with a Venezuelan fitness model.

On October 4, 2025, Montero was critically injured when his motorcycle collided with a pickup truck in Valencia, Venezuela. He experienced six broken ribs, a punctured lung, broken bones, and knee and hip injuries. He was put into an induced coma and needed kidney dialysis and to be resuscitated from cardiac arrest. Montero died in the hospital on October 19, at the age of 35.

== See also ==
- List of Major League Baseball players from Venezuela
