= Biogenesis scandal =

2013 baseball doping scandal

The Biogenesis scandal broke in 2013 when several Major League Baseball (MLB) players were accused of obtaining performance-enhancing drugs ("PEDs"), specifically human growth hormone, from the now-defunct rejuvenation clinic Biogenesis of America. After an ex-employee, annoyed over missing back-pay, revealed clinic records that were "clear in describing the firm's real business: selling performance-enhancing drugs", MLB sued six people connected to Biogenesis, accusing them of damaging the sport by providing banned substances to its players. In July, thirteen involved players received lengthy suspensions of fifty or more games (nearly a third of a season).

== Clinic history ==
Biogenesis of America was a health clinic briefly operating in Coral Gables, Florida, specializing in weight loss and hormone replacement therapy. It was first registered in state corporation records in March 2012, and was founded by Anthony "Tony" Bosch (also listed as the program director). His father, Dr. Pedro Bosch, was listed as the medical director, and Bosch's younger brother, attorney Andrew Bosch, was listed as managing member. Porter Fischer was listed as marketing director. Several employees quit in the fall of 2012 after they were not paid, and the clinic closed months later in December 2012.

== Accusations and investigation ==
On January 22, 2013, the Miami New Times obtained documents from former Biogenesis employee Porter Fischer which it said linked three players – Melky Cabrera, Bartolo Colón, and Yasmani Grandal – who had tested positive for performance-enhancing drugs in 2012 to the clinic. Additionally, the paper said several star players including Alex Rodriguez, Ryan Braun, and Nelson Cruz could be tied to the clinic. The paper, however, refused to hand the documents over to Major League Baseball (MLB) authorities.

The Florida Department of Health, and MLB, both targeted the clinic's owner, Anthony Bosch, each separately taking action against him.

In March, MLB sued Bosch, and his business partners, Carlos Acevedo, Ricardo Martinez, Marcelo Albir, and Paulo da Silveira in an attempt to obtain information. The suit alleged that the six had "actively participated in a scheme ... to solicit or induce Major League players to purchase or obtain PES (performing-enhancing substances)". Subsequently, MLB claimed to have found evidence that a representative of Rodriguez had purchased his medical records. It then paid a former Biogenesis employee for documents.

In April, Bosch received a complaint from the Florida Department of Health for practicing medicine without a license. The complaint urged him to sign a cease and desist agreement.

In May, Bosch agreed to work with MLB investigators in exchange for his name being removed from the lawsuit. MLB conducted a large number of interviews with players it believed may be connected with Biogenesis in June. Every player interviewed was provided legal counsel by the Major League Baseball Players Association (MLBPA).

In August, Wifredo A. Ferrer, U.S. attorney for the southern district of Florida, announced that Bosch intended to plead guilty to one charge of conspiracy to distribute testosterone.

In September, ESPN reported that new client names had been released, previously unknown to the public, which included names such as professional wrestler "Paul 'The Big Show' Wight; former boxing champion Shannon Briggs; one of the most well-known trainers of prominent athletes, David Alexander; and Ernest "Randy" Mims, a longtime friend and business manager of LeBron James. The DEA said "There was never any indication that LeBron James did anything wrong."

== Player suspensions ==
On July 22, 2013, MLB suspended Milwaukee Brewers player Ryan Braun for the remainder of the 2013 season (65 games and the postseason) for his involvement with the Biogenesis clinic. Braun, who lost $3.25 million as a result, did not appeal the suspension. ESPN reported that Braun decided to "strike a deal" with MLB after being presented with the evidence against him. Braun had previously tested positive for testosterone in December 2011, but maintained his innocence and ultimately avoided suspension for that violation on a technicality that his test sample had been improperly handled.

On August 5, 2013, Alex Rodriguez was suspended through the 2014 season (211 games at the time of the decision), but was allowed to play in 2013 pending his appeal of that decision. An arbitrator later upheld the suspension in January 2014, after being allowed to play in the 49 games between the decision and the hearing, technically reducing the suspension to 162 games, representing the entire 2014 regular season and postseason. Twelve other players connected to the Biogenesis case agreed to 50-game suspensions without the right to appeal: Antonio Bastardo, Everth Cabrera, Francisco Cervelli, Nelson Cruz, Fautino de los Santos, Sergio Escalona, Fernando Martínez, Jesús Montero, Jordan Norberto, Jhonny Peralta, César Puello, and Jordany Valdespin. Cabrera, Cruz, and Peralta were All-Stars in 2013. Rodriguez, who received the longest suspension of all the players linked to Biogenesis, was punished for "his use and possession of numerous forms of prohibited performance-enhancing substances, including testosterone and human growth hormone, over the course of multiple years" and "for his attempts to cover up those violations and obstruct a league investigation", according to MLB. The 13 player suspensions are the most to be imposed simultaneously in the history of organized baseball, the previous record being Kenesaw Mountain Landis' banning of eight players for life for throwing the 1919 World Series.

Melky Cabrera, Bartolo Colón, and Yasmani Grandal each had previously been suspended in 2012 and already served 50-game suspensions for their involvement with Biogenesis. Two players mentioned in Biogenesis documents, Gio González and Danny Valencia, were cleared of any wrongdoing.

=== List of suspensions ===
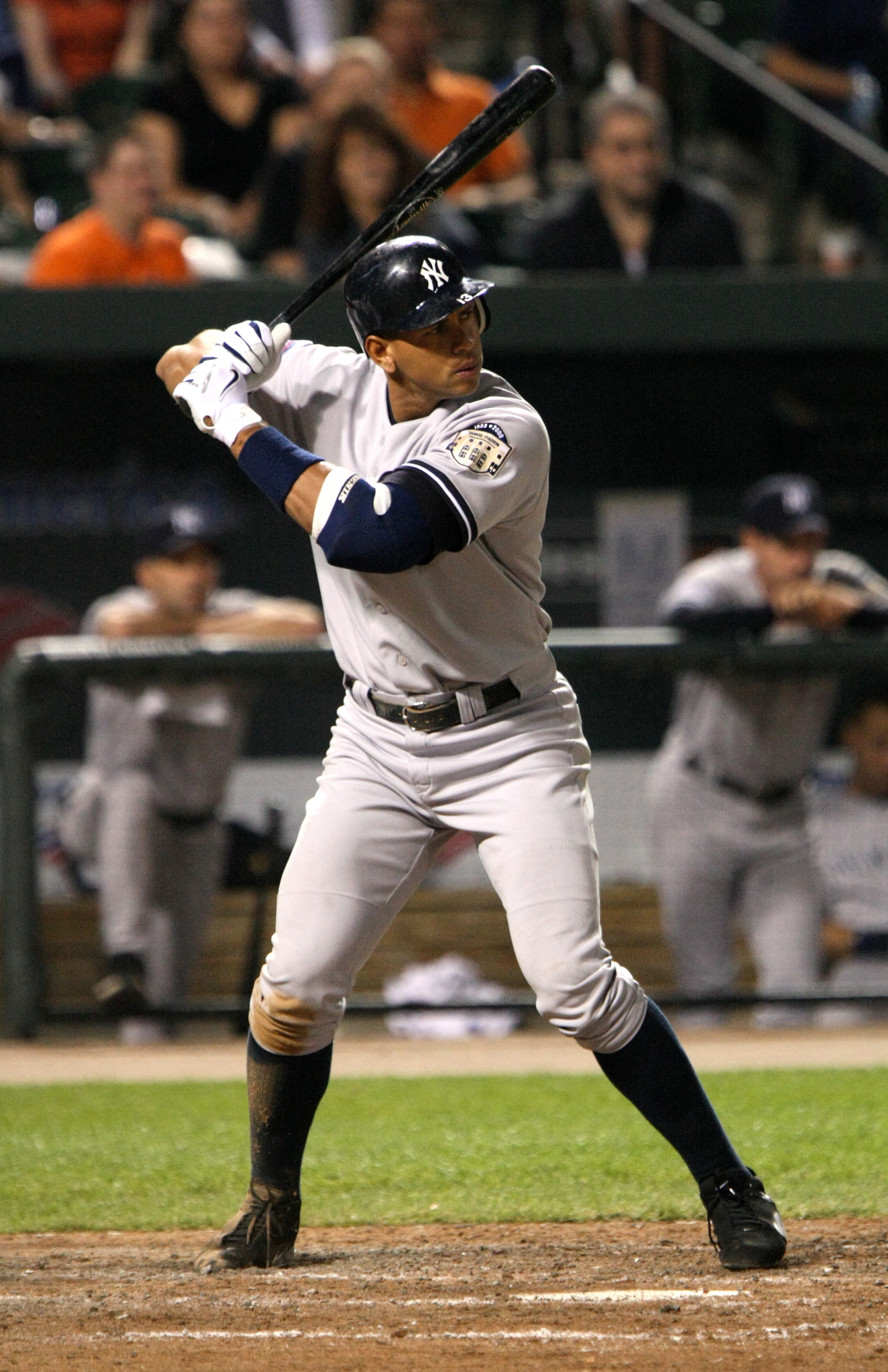
Alex Rodriguez

Name	Team	Position	Length	Notes
Alex Rodriguez	New York Yankees	Third baseman	162 games	Original suspension was from the date of decision until end of the 2014 season (balance of 2013 season, 49 games at the time of the original decision, and the 2014 season for a total of 211 games). Suspension was appealed during the 2013 season, and arbitrator Fredric Horowitz upheld the suspension for the entire 2014 season including playoffs. He would have been suspended for all of postseason under a new 2014 MLB rule regarding suspensions for drugs, but the Yankees failed to make the playoffs that season.
Cesar Carrillo	Detroit Tigers	Pitcher	100 games	Carrillo's suspension was announced earlier and was longer than the other players involved in the scandal because, as a minor leaguer, he was not afforded the protection of the MLBPA.
Ryan Braun	Milwaukee Brewers	Outfielder	65 games	Suspension includes violations of the CBA
Nelson Cruz	Texas Rangers	Outfielder	50 games	2013 All-Star
Everth Cabrera	San Diego Padres	Shortstop	50 games	2013 All-Star
Jhonny Peralta	Detroit Tigers	Shortstop	50 games	2013 All-Star
Antonio Bastardo	Philadelphia Phillies	Pitcher	50 games	
Francisco Cervelli	New York Yankees	Catcher	50 games	On disabled list at the time of suspension
Jordany Valdespin	New York Mets	Outfielder	50 games	In the minor leagues at the time of suspension
Jesús Montero	Seattle Mariners	Catcher	50 games	In the minor leagues at the time of suspension
César Puello	New York Mets	Outfielder	50 games	In the minor leagues at the time of suspension
Sergio Escalona	Houston Astros	Pitcher	50 games	In the minor leagues at the time of suspension
Fernando Martínez	New York Yankees	Outfielder	50 games	In the minor leagues at the time of suspension
Fautino de los Santos	Free agent	Pitcher	50 games	Last played in San Diego Padres farm system
Jordan Norberto	Free agent	Pitcher	50 games	Last played in Oakland Athletics farm system

=== Appeals ===
All of the suspended players, with the exception of Rodriguez, reached an agreement with the League on the length of that suspension, and as part of that agreement waived their contractual right to appeal it to an arbitrator. Rodriguez was the only player who appealed his suspension. Rodriguez was allowed to play while his appeal was heard. The Players Association said it agreed with his decision to appeal, adding "We believe that the Commissioner has not acted appropriately under the Basic Agreement." His appeal was heard by arbitrator Fredric Horowitz, who succeeded Shyam Das as baseball's designated arbitrator in 2012. Das was removed from his position as baseball's long-time arbitrator as a direct result of his overturning Braun's original 50-game suspension for PEDs. Horowitz ruled the original suspension from time of ruling until the end of the 2014 season would stand (though technically reduced from 211 to 162 games since he was allowed to play the 49 games between the ruling and the appeal), leaving Rodriguez's career in limbo.

== Reactions ==
MLB commissioner Bud Selig remarked "We conducted a thorough, aggressive investigation guided by facts so that we could justly enforce our rules ... we pursued this matter because it was not only the right thing to do, but the only thing to do."

The other players involved all agreed to deals that included a waiver of the right to appeal. Cruz blamed a gastrointestinal infection for his drug use and remarked that faced with the weight loss from the infection he was unsure he would be physically able to play and "made an error in judgment that I deeply regret, and I accept full responsibility for that error." An emotional Cabrera said he had taken a banned substance for four days in 2012 to aid in injury recovering before stopping because "I realized it wasn't necessary. My heart and my conscience was killing me." Peralta remarked "I take full responsibility for my actions, have no excuses for my lapse in judgment and I accept my suspension."

On August 18, 2013, as Rodriguez was playing a game against the Boston Red Sox while appealing his suspension, Ryan Dempster intentionally threw at Rodriguez, hitting him on the arm with his fourth pitch and receiving an ovation from the crowd. The home plate umpire, Brian O'Nora, issued a warning to both benches, but did not eject Dempster. He then ejected Joe Girardi for arguing with him. In response, Rodriguez hit a home run later that game.

== See also ==
- Growth hormone in sports
- Major League Baseball scandals
