= César Puello =

Dominican baseball player (born 1991)

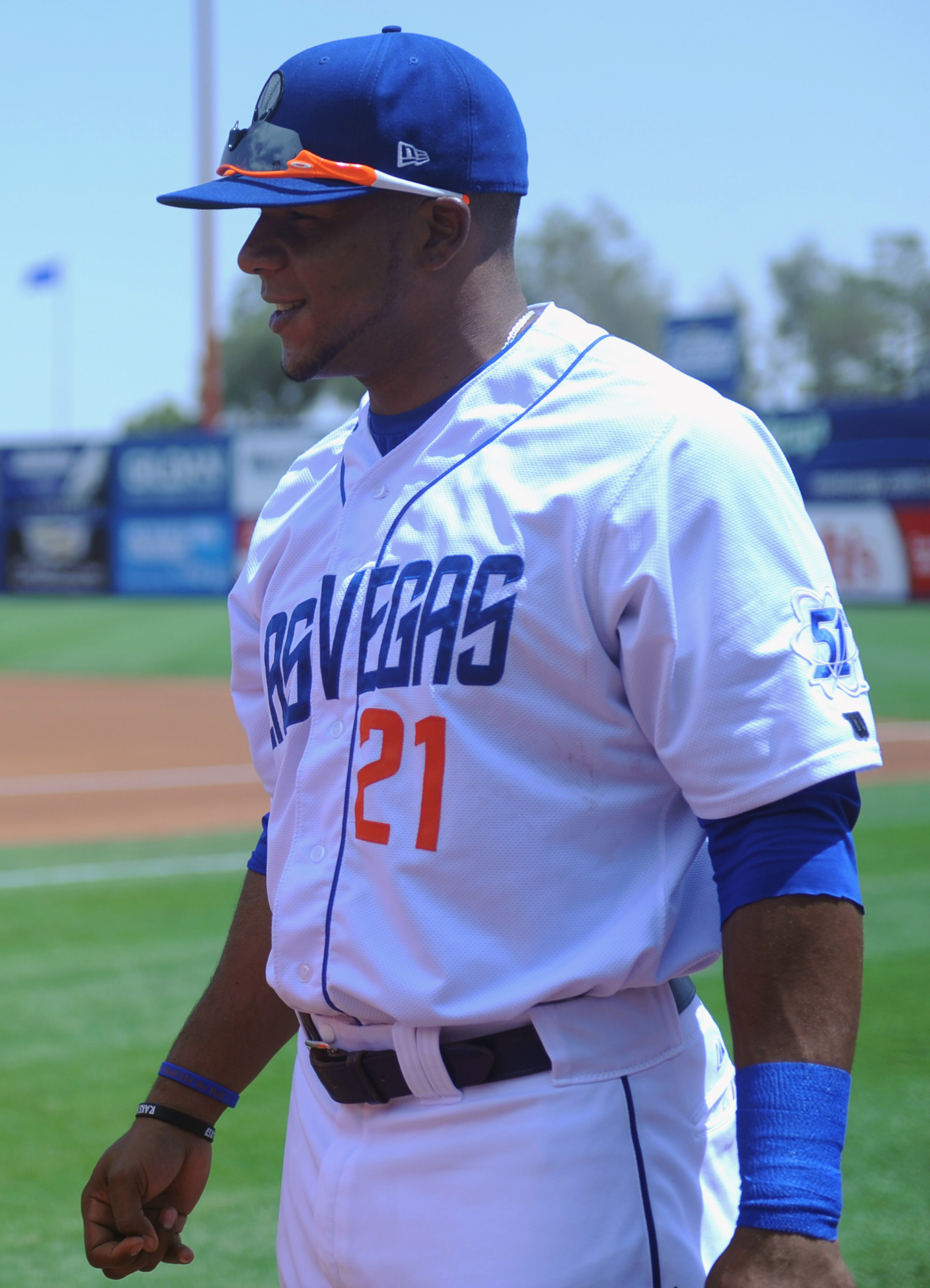
- Puello with the Las Vegas 51s in 2014
- Outfielder
- Born: April 1, 1991 (age 35); La Romana, Dominican Republic
- Batted: Right Threw: Right

MLB debut
- August 9, 2017, for the Los Angeles Angels

Last MLB appearance
- September 27, 2020, for the Boston Red Sox

MLB statistics
- Batting average: .246
- Home runs: 4
- Runs batted in: 21
- Stats at Baseball Reference

Teams
- Los Angeles Angels (2017); Tampa Bay Rays (2017); Los Angeles Angels (2019); Miami Marlins (2019); Boston Red Sox (2020)

César David Puello Santana (born April 1, 1991) is a Dominican former professional baseball outfielder. He played in Major League Baseball (MLB) for the Los Angeles Angels, Tampa Bay Rays, and Miami Marlins. Listed at 6 feet 2 inches (1.88 m) and 220 pounds (100 kg), he bats and throws right-handed.

== Career ==
=== New York Mets ===
On July 2, 2007, Puello signed with the New York Mets organization as an international free agent. In 2008 with the GCL Mets, Puello batted .305/.350/.364. He spent the 2009 season with the rookie ball Kingsport Mets, slashing .296/.373/.423 with 5 home runs and 23 RBI. In 2010 with Savannah, he batted .292/.375/.359 and stole 45 bases. Puello was ranked the #77 prospect in the pre-2011 Baseball America rankings. He spent the 2011 season with the High-A St. Lucie Mets, posting a batting line of .259/.313/.397 with career-highs in home runs (10) and RBI (50). Puello was added to the Mets' 40 man roster on November 18, 2011. In 2012, Puello remained in St. Lucie, slashing .260/.328/.423 with 4 home runs and 21 RBI. After the 2012 regular season, he played for the Surprise Saguaros of the Arizona Fall League. He spent the 2013 season in Double-A with the Binghamton Mets, hitting .326/.403/.547 with stolen 24 bases in 331 at bats.

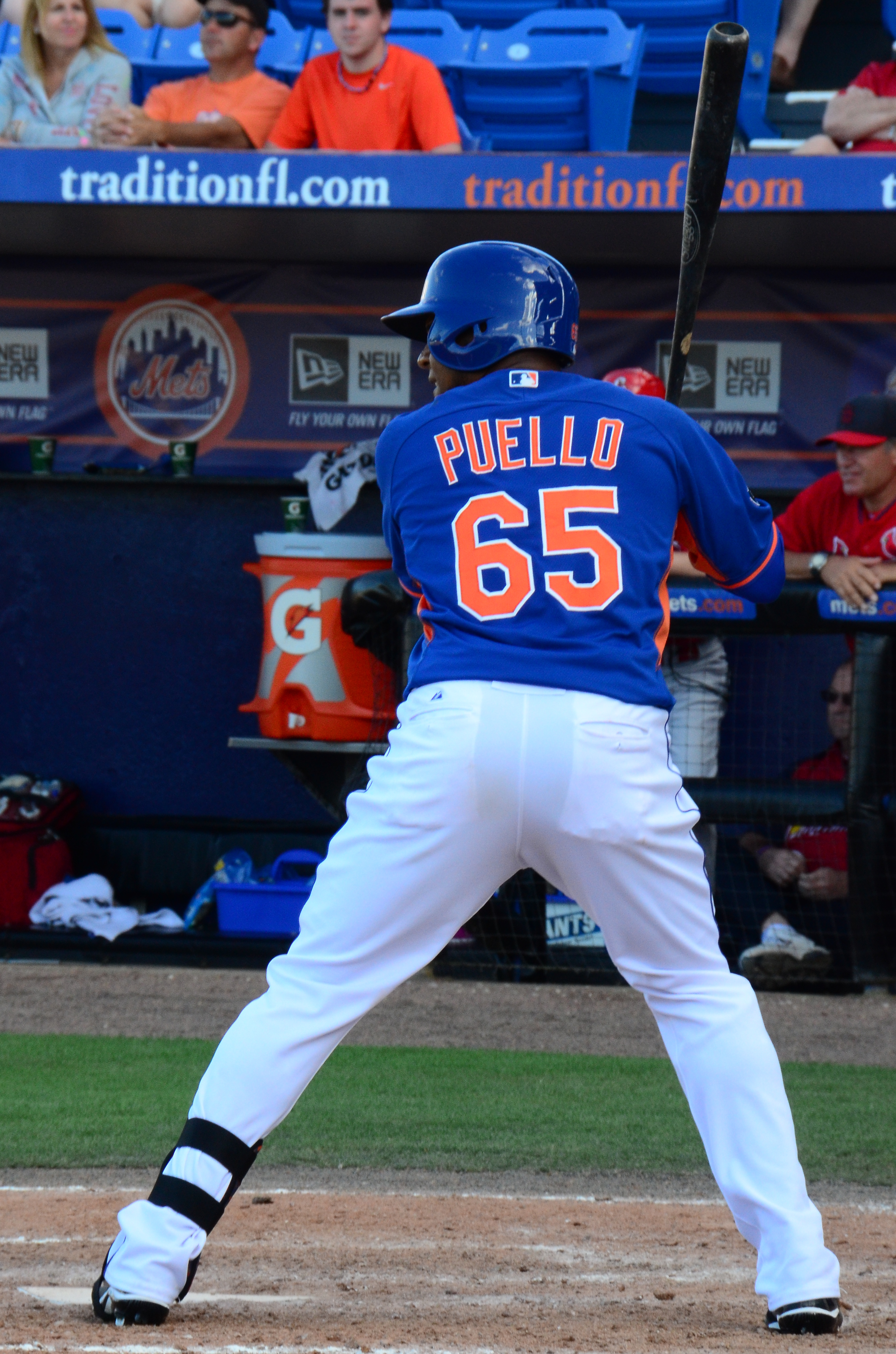
Puello with the Mets during spring training in 2014

Puello was suspended for 50 games on August 5, 2013, for his relationship to the Biogenesis clinic. He spent the 2014 season with the Triple-A Las Vegas 51s, slashing .252/.355/.393 with 7 home runs and 37 RBI. On April 3, 2015, Puello was outrighted off of the Mets' 40-man roster. However, on April 6, the outright was retracted when Puello stated he was injured, and he was instead placed on the 10-day disabled list with a stress fracture in his back. Puello was released by the Mets on August 19, 2015, after having missed the entire year except for one rehab game with the GCL Mets.

=== New York Yankees ===
On December 21, 2015, Puello signed a minor league contract with the New York Yankees organization that included an invitation to spring training. He spent the 2016 season with the Triple-A Scranton/Wilkes-Barre RailRiders, and batted .283/.414/.404 with 5 home runs and 31 RBI. Puello elected free agency following the season on November 7, 2016.

=== Texas Rangers ===
On December 1, 2016, Puello signed a minor league deal with the Texas Rangers organization that included an invitation to Spring Training. He played for the Round Rock Express of the Class AAA Pacific Coast League (PCL). Puello had a June 1 opt-out clause if not on the major league roster. The Rangers granted Puello his release when they did not promote him to the major leagues.

=== Los Angeles Angels ===
On June 3, 2017, Puello signed a minor league contract with the Los Angeles Angels and was assigned to the Triple-A Salt Lake Bees. With Salt Lake, he batted .397/.440/.620 with 13 steals in 184 at bats. The Angels promoted Puello to the major leagues for the first time on August 9, 2017, and he collected his first major league hit and two stolen bases that day against the Baltimore Orioles. On August 12, Puello was designated for assignment by the Angels.

=== Tampa Bay Rays ===
On August 19, 2017, the Puello was claimed off waivers by the Tampa Bay Rays. In 16 major league game for Tampa, he recorded 6 hits in 30 at-bats. On November 6, Puello was outrighted off of the 40-man roster and elected free agency.

=== Arizona Diamondbacks ===
On December 14, 2017, Puello signed a minor league contract with the Arizona Diamondbacks organization. He was assigned to the Triple-A Reno Aces to begin the year. In 73 games for Reno, he batted .317/.426/.454 with 6 home runs and 33 RBI's in 249 at bats. He was released by the Diamondbacks organization on August 1, 2018.

=== San Francisco Giants ===
On August 3, 2018, Puello signed a minor league deal with the San Francisco Giants organization. He was assigned to the Triple-A Sacramento River Cats, where he batted .289/.365/.311 with 4 RBI in 45 at bats in 13 games. On November 2, 2018, Puello elected free agency.

=== Los Angeles Angels (second stint) ===
On November 26, 2018, Puello signed a minor league contract with the Los Angeles Angels that included an invitation to Spring Training. He did not make the team and was assigned to the Triple-A Salt Lake Bees. He had his contract selected to the major leagues on May 28, 2019. He hit his first career home run the next day, off of Yusmeiro Petit of the Oakland Athletics. He was designated for assignment on June 17, following the return of Justin Upton from injury. He had hit .390/.500/.683 in 12 games for the Angels.

=== Miami Marlins ===
On June 19, 2019, Puello was traded to the Miami Marlins in exchange for cash considerations. In 32 games for Miami, he slashed .179/.281/.238 in 32 games. Puello was outrighted off the Marlins roster on October 23, and elected free agency on October 24.

=== Boston Red Sox ===
On February 11, 2020, Puello was signed to a minor league contract by the Boston Red Sox, and was invited to Spring Training as a non-roster invitee. On September 19, 2020, Puello was selected to Boston's active roster, and he made his Red Sox debut that day against the New York Yankees. Overall with the 2020 Red Sox, Puello batted .375 (3-for-8) without a home run or RBI in five games. On October 28, Puello was outrighted off of the 40-man roster and elected free agency. On December 11, 2020, Puello re-signed with the Red Sox on a new minor league contract. After struggling to a .158/.370/.184 batting line across 15 games for the Triple-A Worcester Red Sox, Puello was released on June 3, 2021.

=== New York Mets (second stint) ===
On June 5, 2021, Puello signed a minor league contract with the New York Mets. In 33 appearances for the Triple-A Syracuse Mets, he batted .241/.310/.329 with one home run, 10 RBI, and three stolen bases. Puello was released by the Mets organization on August 13.
