= Cesar Carrillo =

American baseball player (born 1984)

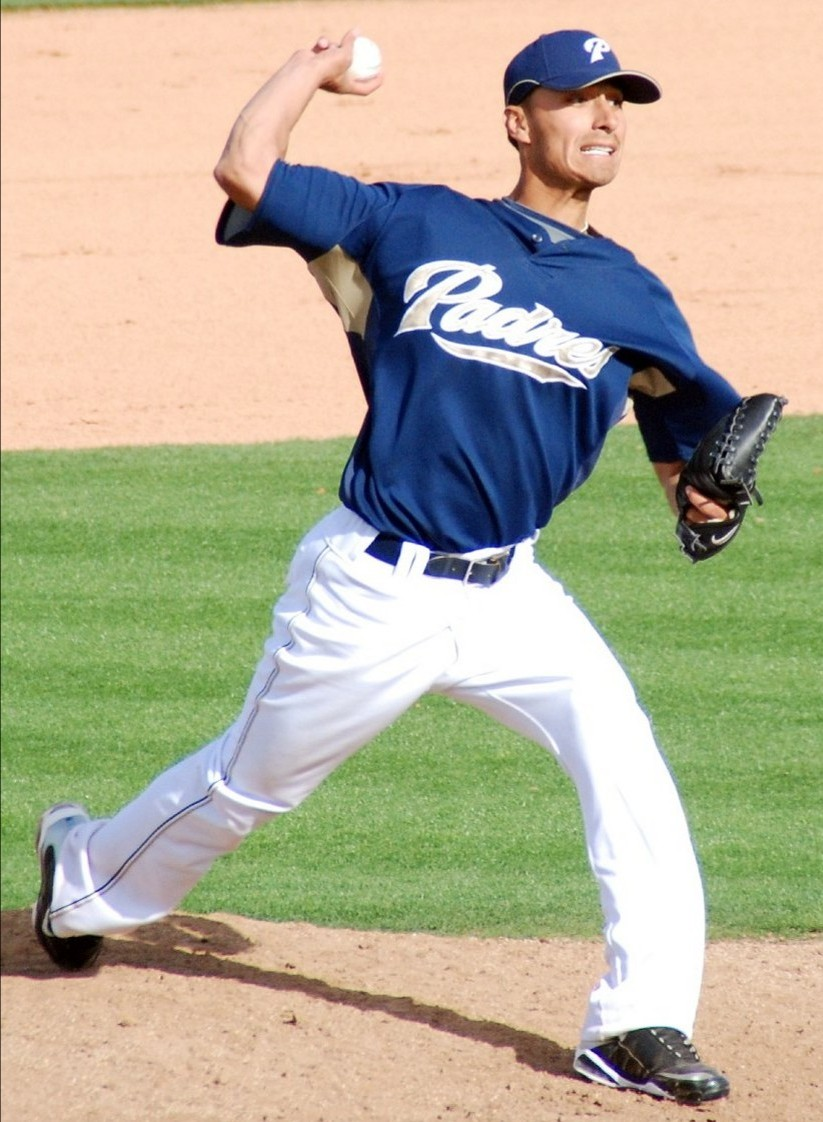
- Carrillo pitching for the San Diego Padres in 2009
- Starting pitcher
- Born: April 29, 1984 (age 41); Chicago, Illinois
- Bats: Right Throws: Right

Professional debut
- MLB: August 13, 2009, for the San Diego Padres
- CPBL: March 21, 2012, for the Brother Elephants

MLB statistics (through 2009)
- Win–loss record: 1-2
- Earned run average: 13.06
- Strikeouts: 4
- Stats at Baseball Reference

Teams
- San Diego Padres (2009); Brother Elephants (2012)

Cesar Carrillo (born April 29, 1984) is an American former professional baseball pitcher. He played for the San Diego Padres, Houston Astros, Detroit Tigers, Arizona Diamondbacks of Major League Baseball. He was inducted to the University of Miami Baseball Hall of Fame in 2019.

== Amateur career ==
=== High school ===
Carrillo attended Mt. Carmel High School in Chicago which boasts other famous sports alums such as Donovan McNabb, Simeon Rice, Antoine Walker, Chris Chelios, and Denny McLain, where he was a two sport star in both basketball and baseball. As a junior, Carrillo decided to concentrate solely on baseball. He played both shortstop and pitcher. As a shortstop, he broke the school's single season hit record with 52 hits his junior year to go along with a 5–1 record and a 1.12 ERA. His senior year, Carrillo posted a 9–1 record with an ERA of 0.96 while batting .370 with 5 home runs and 48 RBI which led to his selection to the All-State team.

=== College ===
Carrillo chose to attend the University of Miami to play baseball for head coach Jim Morris. However, under NCAA regulations, a low score on the ACT exam which Carrillo took to gain entry into the university forced him to sit out the entire 2003 season.

In 2004 Carrillo went 12–0 with two saves while keeping his ERA at 2.69 and compiling 91 strikeouts in 113.2 innings pitched. After the 2004 season, he played collegiate summer baseball with the Brewster Whitecaps of the Cape Cod Baseball League. Carrillo continued the undefeated streak at Miami in 2005 by going 12–0 in his first 15 games until his winning streak was ended against the Clemson University Tigers. Carrillo still managed to obtain one of the most remarkable (albeit not record breaking) streaks in the history of college baseball by starting his career with a record of 24–0. However, Carrillo lost his last two decisions as a starter, the final one coming against Nebraska and Joba Chamberlain in the 2005 Super Regional. Carrillo still compiled impressive stats in the 2005 season by going 13–3 with one save and a 2.22 ERA while striking out 127 batters in 125.2 innings pitched.

== Professional career ==
=== San Diego Padres ===
==== Minor leagues ====
Carrillo was drafted in the 1st round, 18th overall in the 2005 MLB draft by the San Diego Padres. Carrillo signed immediately even though he felt that what the Padres offered him did not match what he felt he deserved. However, Carrillo felt that in the end, his skills would do all the negotiating for him and when he signed his next contract, his loyalty and willingness to prove himself would ultimately translate into a large contract. Carrillo, by most scouts' accounts, was the most "Major League ready" pitcher in the entire draft and it was expected that he could reach the big leagues as a starter within the next year or so. According to Sports Illustrated, Carrillo's "stuff" (his array of pitches) is of Major League caliber. In 2007 scout.com ranked him as the number 1 prospect in the Padres' organization, while Baseball America moved him down to the number 2 prospect, after ranking him number 1 the year before. Carrillo throws a fastball, which has been clocked at 97 MPH, along with a change-up, curveball, and two-seam fastball that reaches somewhere between 89 and 91 MPH and has a lot of movement.

Carrillo began his professional career with the Single-A Lake Elsinore Storm where he started 7 games and went 1–2 with a 7.01 ERA with 29 strikeouts in 25.2 innings pitched. He then made his way up to Double-A Mobile where he went 1–3 with a 3.02 ERA to go along with 43 strikeouts in 50.2 innings pitched. On May 19, Carrillo joined the Triple-A Portland Beavers. However, he was only able to pitch 2.2 innings because of tightness in his right throwing elbow. Carrillo was sent to the Padre team specialist in San Diego and was told that he would need to rehab the elbow for roughly a month. Carrillo, as well as the Padre organization, were pleased with this as opposed to Carrillo being forced to have surgery.

However, in early 2007, Carrillo's arm had not responded to rest and it was determined he needed Tommy John surgery on his elbow. He rehabbed and came back to pitch in June 2008, finishing up the year with Lake Elsinore Storm. His arm strength and control improved during the summer. Carrillo played with the San Antonio Missions in 2009.

Carrillo pitched well in Class AA during the second half of 2009, and was promoted to AAA Portland on July 29.

Carrillo made his Major league debut on August 13, 2009, against the Milwaukee Brewers, giving up three home runs. He went 1–2 in three starts with San Diego.

Carrillo competed for a spot in the starting rotation in Spring training 2010. However, he did not make the team and was optioned to Triple A Portland. On September 2, 2010, he was designated for assignment by the Padres

=== Philadelphia Phillies ===
On September 9, 2010, Carrillo was claimed off waivers by the Philadelphia Phillies. He was only with the organization for 3 days, as the Phillies designated him for assignment on September 12. The Padres then reclaimed Carrillo off waivers on September 15.

=== Houston Astros ===
On September 22, 2010, Carrillo was claimed off waivers by the Houston Astros. He was released on April 29, 2011.

=== Brother Elephants ===
In January 2012, Carrillo signed with the Brother Elephants of the Chinese Professional Baseball League. In 2 starts for Brother, he compiled a 0–1 record and 5.59 ERA with 5 strikeouts across 9+2/3 innings pitched. Carrillo was released by the Elephants on 29 March.

=== Detroit Tigers ===
At the beginning of spring training in 2012, however, Carrillo remained an unsigned free agent. In June 2012, Carrillo signed a Major league contract with the Detroit Tigers.

On January 29, 2013, Carrillo was one of seven baseball players involved in a Miami New Times steroid probe investigation. On March 15, he was suspended for 100 games for violating the Minor League Drug Prevention and Treatment Program. Carrillo reportedly made false statements to league investigators during their investigation of the Biogenesis scandal. Although he claimed not to know Anthony Bosch, who operated the clinic, investigators found that Carrillo received human growth hormone and testosterone from Bosch, who called him "Al Capone."

=== Sugar Land Skeeters ===
The Tigers released him after the conclusion of his suspension and he signed with the independent Sugar Land Skeeters of the Atlantic League of Professional Baseball.

=== Arizona Diamondbacks ===
Carrillo signed a major league deal with the Arizona Diamondbacks in January 2014.

=== Broncos de Reynosa ===
In 2015, he signed with the Broncos de Reynosa of the Mexican League. After the season, he was selected to the roster for the Mexico national baseball team at the 2015 WBSC Premier12. Carrillo began the 2016 season with the Broncos.

=== Pericos de Puebla ===
Partway through the season, Carrillo joined the Pericos de Puebla.

=== Sultanes de Monterrey ===
Carrillo completed the 2016 season with the Sultanes de Monterrey. Carrillo played the entire 2017 season with the Sultanes.

=== Bravos de Leon ===
Carrillo joined the Bravos de León for the 2018 season, and began the 2019 season with the Bravos.

=== Tecolotes de los Dos Laredos ===
Partway through the 2019 season, Carrillo joined the Tecolotes de los Dos Laredos. He was released on July 27, 2019.
