= Ryan Braun =

American baseball player (born 1983)

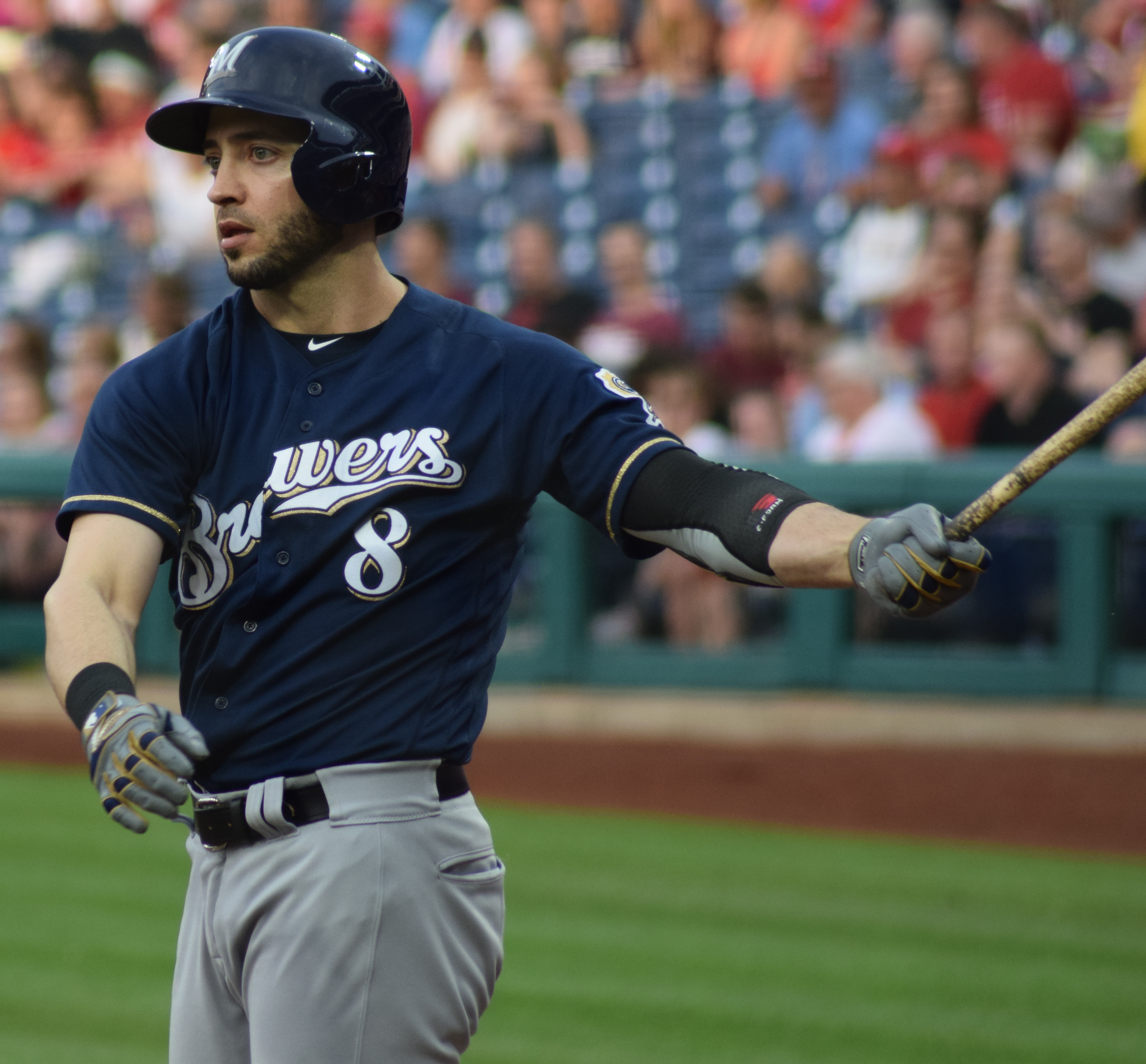
- Braun with the Milwaukee Brewers in 2018
- Left fielder
- Born: November 17, 1983 (age 43); Mission Hills, California, U.S.
- Batted: Right Threw: Right

MLB debut
- May 25, 2007, for the Milwaukee Brewers

Last MLB appearance
- September 27, 2020, for the Milwaukee Brewers

MLB statistics
- Batting average: .296
- Home runs: 352
- Runs batted in: 1,154
- Stats at Baseball Reference

Teams
- Milwaukee Brewers (2007–2020)

Career highlights and awards
- 6× All-Star (2008–2012, 2015); NL MVP (2011); NL Rookie of the Year (2007); 5× Silver Slugger Award (2008–2012); NL home run leader (2012); Milwaukee Brewers Wall of Honor; American Family Field Walk of Fame

Ryan Joseph Braun (born November 17, 1983) is an American former professional baseball player. A left fielder, he played his entire career for the Milwaukee Brewers of Major League Baseball (MLB) from 2007 to 2020. Braun also played right field and first base during his career, and was a third baseman during his rookie season.

Braun was a two-time All-American at the University of Miami, where he was named National Freshman of the Year by Baseball America in 2003. The Brewers drafted him in the first round (fifth overall) in the 2005 MLB draft. He was the team's Minor League Player of the Year in 2006.

Braun was considered a five-tool player for his ability to hit for power and average, his baserunning speed, and his excellent fielding and arm strength. He was ranked number seven by the Sporting News in its 2012 list of the 50 best current players in baseball. He was named the National League Rookie of the Year in 2007, won five Silver Slugger awards (2008–12), and won the NL Most Valuable Player Award (MVP) in 2011. He was named to five straight All-Star Games (2008–12), and was later named to a team-high sixth All-Star Game in 2015. Braun led the NL three times in slugging percentage (in 2007, 2011, and 2012) and once each in hits (2009), home runs (2012), and runs (2012). He was inducted into the Brewers Wall of Honor in 2022, and was inducted into the Brewers Walk of Fame in 2024.

However, Braun came under scrutiny for a testosterone test that he failed in 2011 and then for his connection in 2012 to the Biogenesis of America clinic that provided performance-enhancing drugs to professional baseball players. On July 22, 2013, Braun was suspended without pay for the remainder of the 2013 season and playoffs (totaling 65 regular-season games) for violating the league's drug policy. Braun made public his accusations of anti-semitism by the testing facility employee administering the urine sample in the 2011 test. That test was dismissed for procedural mishandling of the sample. However, he was suspended two years later for his ties to Biogenesis and his disparagement of the employee. He subsequently admitted using PEDs during his 2011 MVP season.

== Early life ==
Ryan Joseph Braun was born on November 17, 1983, to Joe and Diane Braun. He and his younger brother Steve were raised in Los Angeles. He grew up a Los Angeles Dodgers fan. Braun's PONY League teammates included Jack and Matt Cassel, Jason and Jarron Collins, and Jon Garland. Braun later picked up basketball, which became his favorite sport, and soccer, in which he played forward. By the time he entered high school, Braun had chosen to focus solely on baseball.

Braun attended Granada Hills High School in Granada Hills, Los Angeles, California. He was a four-year letterman on the school's baseball team, and three-year team captain and Most Valuable Player (MVP). He played shortstop and pitched through his junior year. As a sophomore in 2000, he recorded the highest batting average of his prep career (.456), while posting a .654 on-base percentage (OBP). During his junior year, he hit .421, with a .668 OBP. Braun capped off his high school career by batting .451 as a senior, with an OBP of .675, and breaking the school record for career home runs with 25. He graduated in 2002, but went undrafted as he told teams that he intended to attend college.

Braun excelled academically as well: his worst grade was one B, in Advanced Placement Chemistry.

== College career ==
Offered baseball scholarships by Stanford University and the University of California, Berkeley, he instead attended the University of Miami on an academic scholarship, due to his excellent high school grades. He chose Miami for its academics, its athletics, and its social scene, noting: "I think the girls were the deal closer on the recruiting trip."

There, Braun was named "National Freshman of the Year", and a first-team "Freshman All-American", by Baseball America in 2003, as well as first team All American by the Jewish Sports Review. He was also named first-team All-American by Collegiate Baseball. After the 2004 season, he played collegiate summer baseball with the Brewster Whitecaps of the Cape Cod Baseball League.

During his junior year, his final and most successful at Miami, Braun batted .396 with 18 home runs, a .726 slugging percentage, 76 RBIs, and 23 stolen bases. He was ninth in slugging and 10th in RBIs in NCAA Division I, and was named to Baseball America's 2005 College All-American Team as the designated hitter (DH). He moved from shortstop to third base during the year. His performance earned Braun the Atlantic Coast Conference Baseball Player of the Year award, and a spot as one of the finalists for the Golden Spikes Award, the most prestigious individual award in college baseball. He was inducted into the University of Miami Hall of Fame in 2017.

== Professional career ==
=== Draft and minor leagues ===
The Milwaukee Brewers drafted Braun in the first round (fifth overall) in the 2005 major league draft as a third baseman, and he signed for $2.45 million.

Assigned to the Helena Brewers in the Advanced Rookie Pioneer League in 2005, Braun batted .341/.383/.585 in 10 games. He was then promoted to the West Virginia Power in the Class A South Atlantic League, where he hit .355/.396/.645, and was rated the fifth-best prospect in the league. His most memorable moment was when he hit a walk-off grand slam to lead the Power into the playoffs.

Braun began 2006 playing for the A-Advanced Brevard County Manatees. He earned a spot in the Florida State League All-Star game, and played in the All-Star Futures Game. He was rated the top third base prospect in the FSL, and Baseball America rated him the best batting prospect in the league. On June 21, Braun was promoted to the Class AA Huntsville Stars (Alabama) of the Southern League. In July he was voted the Brewers' Organizational Player of the Month, and at the end of the season he was voted the sixth-best prospect in the Southern League. Collectively between Class A and Class AA, Braun finished with a .289 average, 22 home runs, 77 RBIs, and 26 stolen bases. He received the 2006 Robin Yount Performance Award as the Milwaukee Brewers Minor League Player of the Year.

Later in 2006, in the Arizona Fall League he hit .326/.396/.641 in 92 at bats for the Scottsdale Scorpions. He led the AFL with 16 extra-base hits, tied for tops with 9 doubles, ranked second in slugging percentage and HR/AB ratio (1/15), tied for second in home runs (6), and tied for third in RBIs (25). He was rated one of the top three prospects in the league, and was voted to the AFL All-Prospects Team.

Baseball America rated Braun the Brewers' #2 prospect for 2007. He began the year with the Nashville Sounds of the AAA Pacific Coast League. Before being called up to the majors in late May, in 113 at bats he led the PCL with a .726 slugging percentage while batting .354 (6th), with 10 home runs (T-2nd) and a .426 on-base percentage (5th).

=== Major League career ===
==== 2007: Rookie of the Year ====
The Brewers brought Braun to spring training in 2007. Their regular third baseman Corey Koskie was suffering from post-concussion syndrome, and missed the entire year. In 11 spring training games, Braun tied for 10th in the majors in home runs (5), and second in RBIs (15).

In 2007, Braun had what some sportswriters called one of the most dominant rookie seasons in baseball history. Called up on May 24 by the Brewers, he hit his first major league home run two days later. Braun was voted the National League (NL) Rookie of the Month for June, ranking first in RBIs (21) and tied for first in home runs (6) among NL rookies that month. He also recorded a .716 slugging percentage and a .435 OBP. In July, Braun became the fastest player in Brewers history to hit 10 major league home runs, doing so in his 38th game. He hit his 15th home run in the 50th game of his career, and his 20th in his 64th game, making him the fastest to those milestones since Albert Pujols in 2001. He was also the fastest to 20 homers in Brewers history. At month's end, he received his second consecutive NL Rookie of the Month Award, as well as his first NL Player of the Month Award (making him the first player to have won both awards in the same month). He hit a league-leading 11 home runs, with 25 RBIs, while batting .345.

In mid-August, Brewers manager Ned Yost moved Braun from third in the batting order to cleanup, switching him with Prince Fielder. The move was expected to allow Braun to steal more, as batting before Fielder was not conducive to him risking being thrown out on steal attempts. Additionally, successfully stealing a base would hypothetically allow opponents to intentionally walk Fielder and avoid pitching to him. At the end of the month, however, Yost reverted to his previous batting order. On August 26, Braun hit his 25th home run in his 82nd game, quicker than any major leaguer since Mark McGwire in 1987.

On September 9, the Brewers became the third team in major league history to start a game with three straight home runs, as Rickie Weeks, J. J. Hardy, and Braun homered in consecutive at bats. Braun said, "That was pretty cool. I was never part of something like that before." Braun's home run in that game also broke the Brewers rookie record for home runs (28). Braun hit his 30th homer in his 94th game, a pace no player had set to start a career since McGwire hit 30 in 84 games during 1986 and 1987.

Braun finished with an NL-leading .634 slugging percentage, a mark that set new all-time rookie and Brewers records. He was fifth in the league in at bats per home run (13.3) and OPS (1.004), tied for fifth in home runs (34), and eighth in batting average (.324) among hitters with at least 490 plate appearances. He led the Brewers in batting average and slugging percentage, and was second behind Fielder in home runs, runs (91), and RBIs (97), tied for second in triples (6), and third in OBP (.370) and steals (15), despite not having played in the first 48 games of the season. Braun obliterated the club rookie records of 28 home runs and 81 RBIs, set by Fielder in 2006.

"I was always small. I was a leadoff hitter growing up, until I was 13 or 14 years old and had a little growth spurt and started hitting home runs."

— Ryan Braun

Braun had considerable success against left-handed pitchers. He had the best batting average (.450), OBP (.516), and slugging percentage (.964) of any major league hitter with at least 125 plate appearances against lefties, and was tied for second in the majors in home runs (15). Braun credited his father with his success against lefties, saying, "My dad is left-handed, so growing up, the majority of time, I took batting practice off of him."

Braun collected several awards at season's end. He won the 2007 NL Rookie of the Year Award in a vote by 32 members of the Baseball Writers' Association of America, beating out Troy Tulowitzki by two points in the closest NL vote since the system was revised in 1980. Of all prior NL Rookies of the Year, only Pujols and Willie McCovey hit for higher batting averages in their rookie year. Braun was voted the 2007 NL Sporting News Rookie of the Year by 488 major league players and 30 managers. Braun also received the 2007 Players Choice NL Most Outstanding Rookie in a vote by his fellow major league players. "When your peers recognize you with an award, that's great", he said. "Those are the guys out there on the field with you, competing against you. Their opinion counts the most, for a player." In voting for the NL Most Valuable Player (MVP) Award, Braun received two 10th-place votes and finished 24th overall.

==== 2008: All-Star and Silver Slugger ====
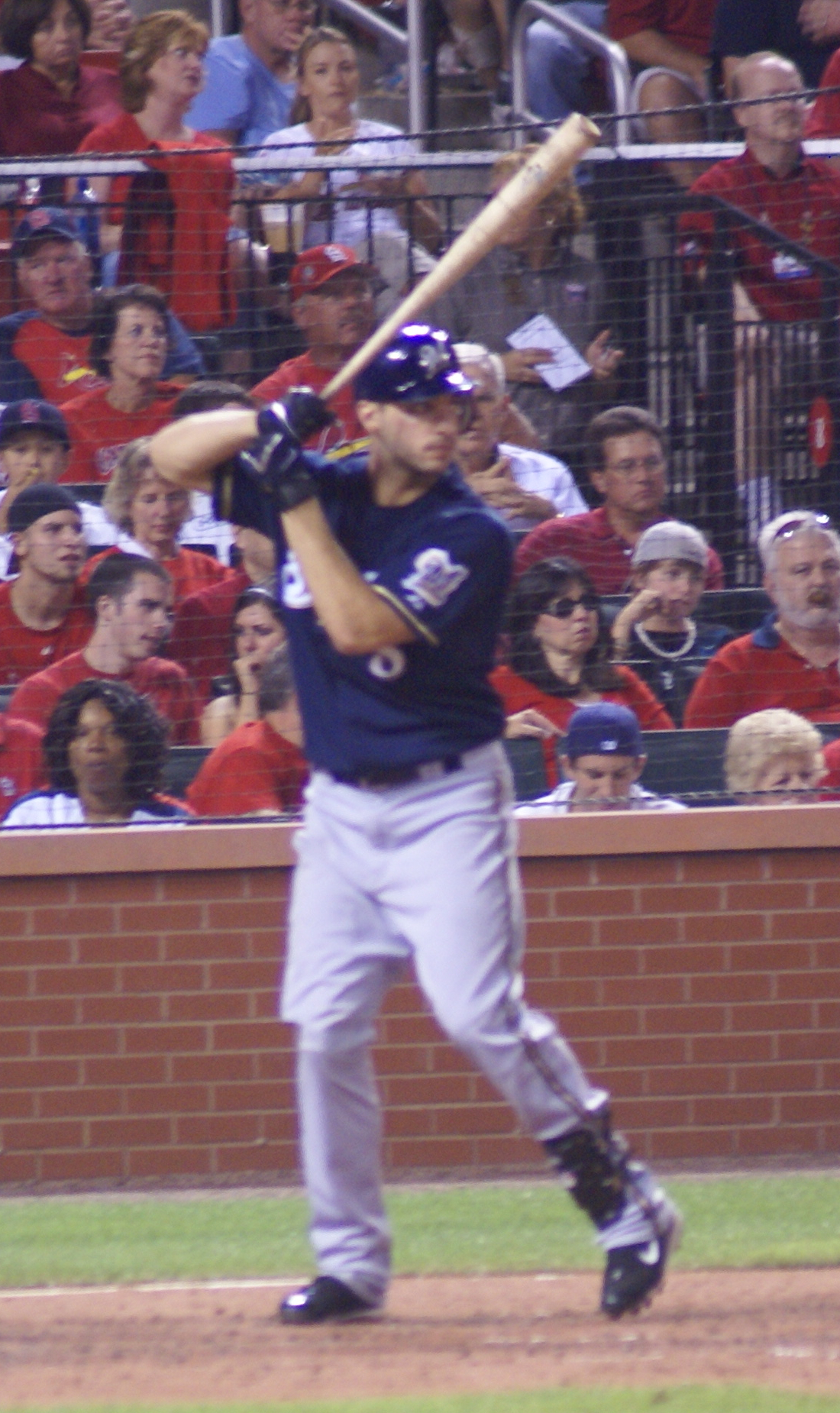
Braun batting in 2008

In March 2008, the Brewers renewed Braun's contract for $455,000, a $75,000 increase. Braun then signed an 8-year, $45–$51 million contract extension (the total depending on his "Super 2" service-time ranking after the 2009 season) on May 15, 2008. The contract was through the year 2015. The deal included Braun's $455,000 salary for 2008, and a $2.3 million bonus in 2008. It could have increased to $51 million through incentives. Braun also had a no-trade clause for the first four years, and then a limited no-trade clause allowing him to block deals to 12 teams from 2012 to 2013, and 6 teams from 2014 to 2015. The contract would keep Braun locked up through his age-31 season. It was the largest contract in Brewers' history, surpassing Jeff Suppan's. It was also the largest contract in baseball history given to a player with less than three years' experience. Braun's agent, Nez Balelo, crunched enough numbers to show him what he potentially could have made over the life of this contract if he had chosen not to sign it. "But the question I ultimately asked myself was, `What can't I buy with that amount of money?"' Braun said.

Braun drove in 134 runs in his first 162 games in the majors, more RBIs than any active player. He reached the 150-RBI milestone faster than any major leaguer since Boston's Walt Dropo needed only 155 games, in 1949–51. On June 17, 2008, he drove in his 152nd career RBI, in his 182nd game.

Braun was named the NL's Player of the Month, after batting .366 in July (6th in the NL) with 9 home runs (3rd), and 23 RBIs (7th). He also led the league with 76 total bases and 18 extra base hits, and was among NL leaders with 37 hits (2nd), 3 triples (2nd), and a 1.163 OPS (3rd). He had back-to-back 4-hit games, just the 5th player in team history to accomplish that feat. "It's a huge honor", Braun said. "The way I look at it, you're the MVP of the National League for that month. It's definitely a big accomplishment.

As of August 8, Braun's major league career start was one of the best ever. In 227 games to start a career, he was first with 558 total bases and 133 extra base hits, second with 64 home runs, and tied for second with 181 RBIs.

On August 9, Braun strained the intercostal muscles around his oblique ribcage. That led to him missing a number of games, and shortening his swing for a few weeks. After returning, on September 25 he hit his first grand slam, delivering a 2-out, 2–2 pitch from the Pirates' Jesse Chavez into the left field bleachers of Miller Park in the bottom of the 10th inning, winning the game 5–1, and keeping the Brewers' 2008 postseason hopes alive. Braun became the first—and as of July 2018, the only—player to hit a walk-off grand slam at Miller Park. Three days later, Braun helped put the Brewers into the postseason for the first time since 1982, by hitting a go-ahead 2-run homer in the bottom of the 8th against the Chicago Cubs. The homer was the difference in the game, which gave the Brewers a one-game lead over the New York Mets for the NL wild card.

Braun was a starting outfielder for the NL in the 2008 All-Star Game. He finished first in fan voting among NL outfielders, and second among all NL players, with 3,835,840 votes, behind only Chase Utley of the Phillies (3,889,602). He also finished first in player voting. Braun was the first Brewers outfielder voted to start an All-Star game. He was one of seven first-time starters in the game, and–along with Kosuke Fukudome and Josh Hamilton–one of only three who had not reached the major leagues until 2007 or 2008.

Braun came in third in the Home Run Derby at Yankee Stadium. "It's something you dream about", Braun said. "That's as big a stage as you can get on.... it's going to be a lot of fun." He had his friend and agent, Nez Balelo, a former minor league infielder, pitch to him. He hit seven home runs in each of the first and second rounds, finishing with 14 (three behind finalist Justin Morneau, who hit five in the final round to win the Derby).

On June 3, Braun became the third-fastest major leaguer to reach 50 career home runs. He did so in 171 career games; the only players to reach that plateau sooner were Rudy York and Mark McGwire. On July 8, Braun hit his 56th home run in his 200th game, the third-highest total ever in a major leaguer's initial 200 games, behind McGwire (59) and York (59).

In early August, Braun hit his 30th home run, becoming just the second player in MLB history to hit 30 or more homers in each of his first two seasons. Braun hit 71 home runs in his first two seasons, tying him with Pujols for fourth all-time. Joe DiMaggio tops the list with 75 home runs, followed by Ralph Kiner (74) and Eddie Mathews (72).

In 2008, in 151 games Braun hit 37 home runs (tied for 4th in the NL, behind Ryan Howard, Adam Dunn, and Carlos Delgado), with 106 RBIs (9th), and batted .285 with a .553 slugging percentage (5th). He also led the league with 83 extra base hits, and had 338 total bases (2nd in the NL), 7 triples (6th), 16.5 at-bats-per-home-run (10th), and 611 at bats (10th). 12.5% of his plate appearances were extra base hits (3rd in the NL; behind Ryan Ludwick and Pujols), he had 29 infield hits (7th), and he stole third base 6 times (9th).

Against starting pitchers, Braun hit .244 the first time he faced them in a game, .331 the second time, and .328 with a .672 slugging percentage the third time. Braun led the Brewers in batting average, slugging percentage, triples, home runs, RBIs, extra base hits, total bases, at-bats-per-home run, OPS (.888), runs (92), and hits (174).

Braun hit .313 in October against the Phillies in his first postseason series, which the Brewers lost 3–1.

Braun was voted to the 2008 NL Sporting News All-Star Team, by a panel of 41 major league general managers and assistant general managers. He also won the 2008 NL Outfielder Silver Slugger Award. In voting for the 2008 NL MVP award, Braun was third (with 139 points), behind Pujols and Ryan Howard.

==== 2009: All-Star and Silver Slugger ====
"One thing is for certain: You've got to tie Braun up from time to time. If you don't, he's going to feast on you."

— Chicago Cubs manager Lou Piniella, defending Ryan Dempster for hitting Braun

In 2009, Braun was named to Sporting News' list of the 50 greatest current players in baseball, ranking No. 32. A panel of 100 baseball people, many of them members of the Hall of Fame and winners of major baseball awards, were polled to arrive at the list.

Braun was named NL Player of the Week for May 4–10, after leading the NL with 12 RBIs for the week while hitting .458/.567/.958 with 3 home runs. He hit the second grand slam of his career and recorded a career-high six RBIs on May 6, and on May 9 he reached base in all five of his plate appearances.

Braun led all NL outfielders in fan voting for the All-Star Game for the second year in a row, with 4.1 million votes, ahead of Raúl Ibañez and Carlos Beltrán. He was third among all NL vote-getters, trailing Pujols and Chase Utley. He was the first Brewer to be voted in as a starter in consecutive years since Robin Yount (in 1982 and 1983), and the third Brewer position player voted to start twice, along with Yount and Paul Molitor (1980 and 1988). Braun started in right field, the first time he had ever played the position, and batted cleanup, going 0–2.

Braun was second all-time, with 79 home runs over his first two calendar years in the major leagues, to Phillies Hall of Famer Chuck Klein (83); ahead of third-place Joe DiMaggio and Mark McGwire (77). If Braun continues to hit home runs at the rate he had hit them through July 1, 2009, he will reach 600 home runs in his 15th major league season. In September, Braun became the second-fastest active player to hit 100 home runs (behind only Ryan Howard), as he hit his 100th homer in his 400th major league game. Braun's 103 home runs in his first three Major League seasons are sixth-most in baseball history, behind Pujols (114), Mark Teixeira (107), and three Hall of Famers—Kiner (114), Matthews (112), and Joe DiMaggio (107).

In 2009, Braun had even greater success against left-handed pitchers. Against them he had the second-best OBP (.475), slugging percentage (.723), and OPS (1.198), and third-best batting average (.395), of all NL hitters with at least 125 plate appearances.

He finished the season with an NL-leading 203 hits, becoming the first Brewer to lead his league in hits since Molitor topped the AL in 1991. Braun became the fourth Brewer in team history to collect 200 or more hits in a season, and the first in 18 years. His .320 batting average at the end of the season was the highest by a Brewer since Jeff Cirillo hit .326 in 1999.

In 2009, in addition to leading the NL in hits, Braun was 2nd in runs (113), 4th in RBIs (114), total bases (350), extra base hits (77), and hit by pitch (13), 7th in batting average (.320) and power-speed number (24.6), 8th in OPS (.937), 9th in slugging percentage (.551) and doubles (39), tied for 10th in triples (6), and tied for 11th in home runs (32). He was also 4th in the league in infield hits (25).

He became only the second Brewer ever to hit 30 home runs and steal 20 bases in the same season. Braun also became the eighth player in major league history with at least 100 runs, 100 RBIs, 200 hits, 30 homers, 20 stolen bases, and a .300 average in the same season.

Braun was voted to the NL Sporting News All-Star Team in 2009, making it for the second year in a row. He received votes from all 14 voting NL team executives (as did Pujols and Utley; Mauer was named on all AL ballots). Braun was awarded the 2009 NL Outfielder Silver Slugger Award, winning it for the second year in a row. He became the first Brewer since Molitor, more than two decades prior, to win a Silver Slugger Award in consecutive years. Cecil Cooper is the only other Brewer to have done it.

==== 2010: All-Star and Silver Slugger ====
Braun was named to Sporting News' 2010 list of the 50 greatest current players in baseball, ranking No. 22.

He was elected a starting NL All-Star outfielder for the third year in a row, in 2010. Braun led all major league outfielders in All-Star votes for the third straight year, with 2,972,525, despite Milwaukee being the smallest media market in the majors. As in 2009, he received more votes than any NL players other than Pujols and Utley. He became the first Brewer to be a three-time All-Star starter, passing Yount and Molitor.

Braun was named NL Player of the Week for August 1–8, after leading the majors with a .538 batting average, 14 hits, and 8 runs scored, and notching a career-best five-hit performance in one game.

For the season, Braun was second in the NL in hits (188) and doubles (45), 5th in total bases (310), 6th in runs (101), 7th in RBIs (103) and extra base hits (71), and 9th in batting average (.304).

Braun hit the eighth-most home runs by any major leaguer through his first four seasons with 128. He also became the fifth player in major league history to hit at least 125 homers with a .300 average over his first four seasons. His 94 home runs in 2008–10 were the most by any right-handed outfielder.

He was the first player in Brewers history to hit 20 or more home runs in each of his first four seasons, and the third Brewer to have 100 or more RBIs in three consecutive seasons. He also became the second player in Brewers history to have consecutive 100-RBI, 100-run seasons.

Braun was awarded the 2010 NL Outfielder Silver Slugger Award, winning it for the third year in a row. He became the second Brewer to win a Silver Slugger Award in three consecutive years. Robin Yount is the only other Brewer to have won the award three times (1980, 1982, and 1989). Braun was also voted to the 2010 NL Sporting News All-Star Team, making the team for the third year in a row.

==== 2011: NL MVP, All-Star, Silver Slugger, and 30–30 club ====
In 2011, Braun was again named to Sporting News' list of the 50 greatest current players in baseball, ranking No. 16. A panel of 21 MLB executives was polled to arrive at the list.

He was named NL Player of the Month for April, after tying for the NL lead in home runs (10) and runs scored (24), while setting a new team record by reaching base in 28 consecutive games to start a season (erasing Yount's record of 23 games, set in 1983). He was also named NL Player of the Week, for the week ended April 25.

He led all National League players in All-Star balloting, with an NL-record 5.93 million votes, as he garnered more votes than any other NL outfielder for the fourth year in a row. He was voted an NL All-Star starter for a franchise record fourth time. Braun had a 23-game hitting streak, the third-longest in team history.

On August 31, he hit a ball deep to left-center field and tried for an inside-the-park home run, but fell on his way to home plate and was tagged out. The crowd gave him a standing ovation for his effort.

On September 23, Braun hit a three-run, 450-foot home run that sealed the Brewers' NL-Central-clinching victory. He was named the NL Player of the Month for the fourth time in his career in September, after tying for second in the league with 8 home runs and 22 RBIs, while batting .330.

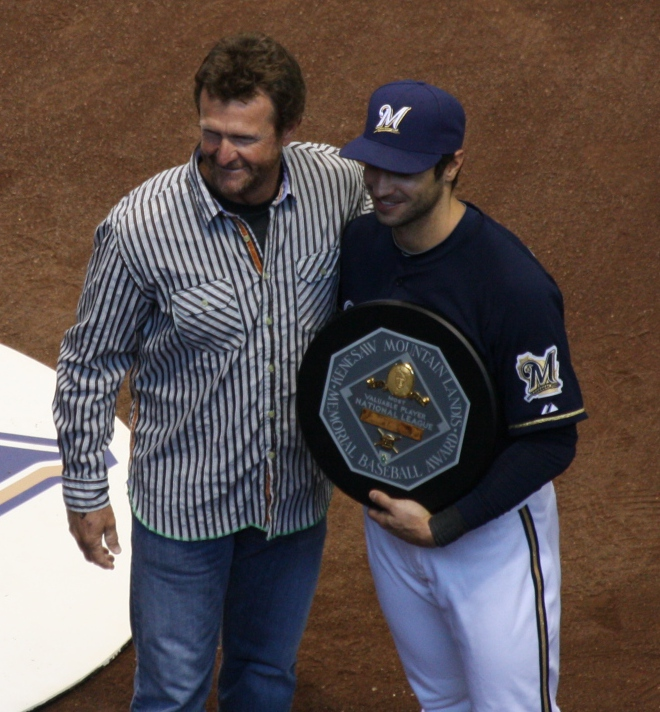
Braun accepts his 2011 National League MVP award from 1989 American League winner Robin Yount.

In 2011, Braun led the National League in slugging percentage (.597), OPS (.994), and extra base hits (77). He was 2nd in the NL in batting average (.332), runs (109), and total bases (336), 4th in RBIs (111) and doubles (38; tied), 5th in on-base percentage (.397) and hits (187), 6th in home runs (33; T), and 7th in stolen bases (33; a career high). On defense, he led all major league left fielders in fielding percentage, at .996.

Braun became the 7th player to have at least four 30-homer, 100-RBI seasons in his first five years. He also became the 11th major leaguer to hit at least 30 home runs in four of his first five seasons.

In 2011, Braun became the second Brewer (and 56th player in MLB history) to join the 30–30 club. He was also the second player in Brewers' history to have two 20-steals/20-homers seasons. He became the first Brewer to post three 100-run, 100-RBI seasons. In addition, he became one of three Brewers who have had four 100-RBI seasons.

Through 2011, he was third among active ballplayers in career slugging percentage (.563), behind Pujols and Alex Rodriguez, and first among left fielders in career fielding percentage (.994). He was also the Brewers' all-time leader in career batting average (.312), slugging percentage, and OPS (.933), and fourth in on-base percentage (.371).

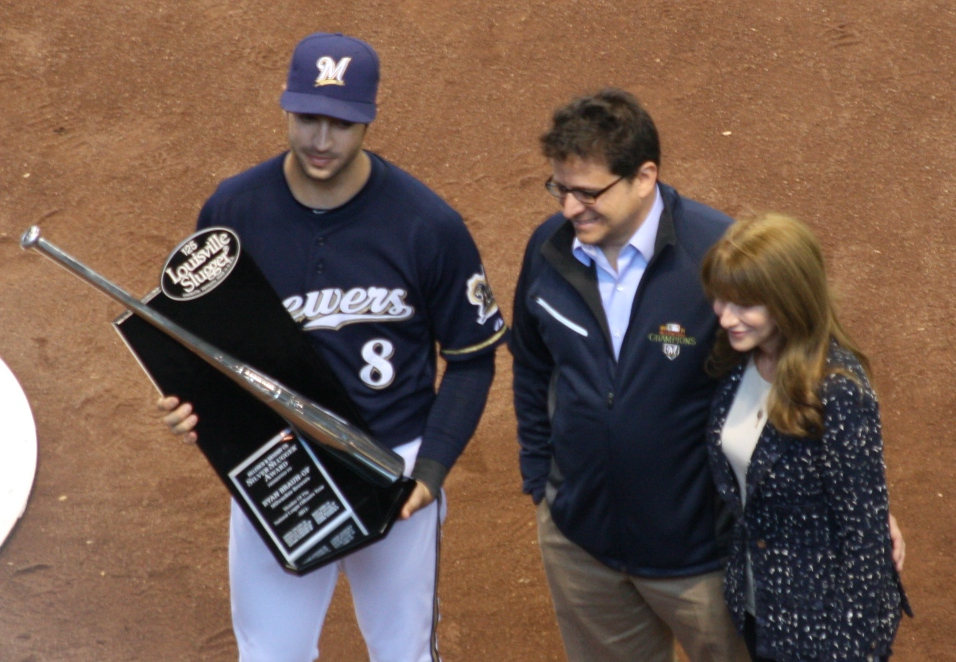
Braun accepting his 2011 Silver Slugger Award from Brewers owner Mark Attanasio

In the 2011 playoffs, through October 14 Braun set the major league postseason record by reaching base in the first inning in nine consecutive playoff games. He also tied Yount and Molitor for the Brewers' team record with his 22nd career postseason hit, and tied Charlie Moore for team's longest postseason hitting streak, at 7 games. In the postseason he led the Brewers with a .405 batting average, while driving in a team-best 10 RBIs.

Braun was awarded the 2011 NL Outfielder Silver Slugger Award, winning it for the fourth year in a row. That set a Brewers team record, and he became the fourth NL outfielder to win the award four years in a row. He was named the team's 2011 MVP in unanimous voting by the Milwaukee chapter of the BBWAA.

On November 22, Braun was named the NL MVP award winner for the 2011 season, receiving 20 of 32 first place votes.

==== 2012: All-Star, Home Run Champion, Silver Slugger, 40–30 club ====
On April 30, 2012, he became the first player to hit 3 home runs in one game at Petco Park. Braun was named to his fifth consecutive NL All-Star team as a reserve outfielder. It marked Braun's fifth All-Star honor, tying him with Cecil Cooper and Paul Molitor for the most in Brewers franchise history. On July 20, Braun had his 1,000th career hit. He accomplished the feat in his 815th game, sooner in his career than Pete Rose, the all-time hits leader, who did it in his 831st game.

On September 16, Braun hit his 200th career home run in his 867th game, against the New York Mets, faster than all but four active players in the Majors (Ryan Howard, Albert Pujols, Adam Dunn, and Alex Rodriguez). In his following at bat, Braun hit another home run, his 40th of the year, the first time he had reached the 40-home-run mark.

In 2012, Braun led the National League in home runs (41), runs scored (108), total bases (356), and power-speed number (34.6), and led the league in OPS (.987) and extra-base hits (80) for the second consecutive year. He was 2nd in the NL in RBIs (112), slugging percentage (.595), and hits (191), 3rd in batting average (.319), 4th in on-base percentage (.391), and 9th in stolen bases (30). On defense, he led all NL left fielders in putouts (276) and in range factor/game (1.87). By driving in more than 100 runs in 2012 for the fifth consecutive year, Braun became the first player in Brewers history to have five 100-RBI seasons. Cecil Cooper and Prince Fielder each drove in 100 runs four times. Braun became the ninth player in major league history to have a season of 40 home runs and 30 stolen bases.

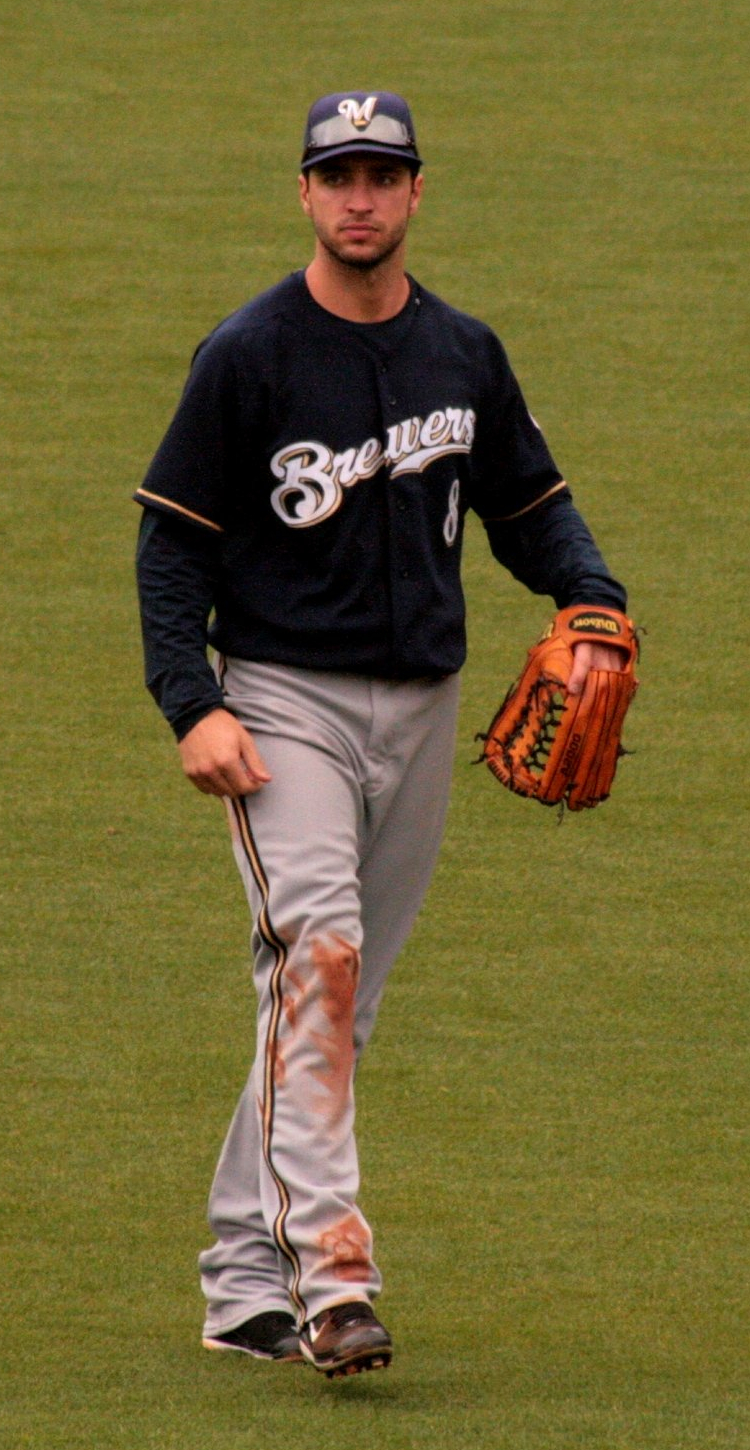
Braun in the outfield

Braun was awarded the 2012 NL Outfielder Silver Slugger Award, winning it for the fifth year in a row. His five consecutive awards are the longest active streak in the major leagues.

Braun finished second in National League MVP voting for 2012, behind Buster Posey.

==== 2013: Suspension ====
In 2013, Braun played in 61 games with a .298 batting average, including 14 doubles, 9 home runs, and 38 RBIs in 225 at bats. On July 22, 2013, Braun was suspended without pay for the remainder of the season after admitting to using performance-enhancing drugs during his 2011 NL MVP season, thus violating the Basic Agreement and its Joint Drug Prevention and Treatment Program.

==== 2014 ====
After the Brewers traded right fielder Norichika Aoki to the Royals for pitcher Will Smith, Braun moved to right field, opening a spot for Khris Davis to play left field.

In 2014, Braun batted a career-low .266, with 19 home runs while leading the Brewers with 81 RBIs and tying for the team lead with 6 triples. He finished the season with 230 career home runs, and during the season he tied Brewers records with 3 home runs and 7 RBIs in one game. He also became the 12th player to appear in 1,000 games with the Brewers.

Braun underwent surgery in October to desensitize the pain receptors near the nerves at the base of his right thumb. The problem was affecting his grip on the bat. The surgery was performed by Dr. Vernon Williams. Through 2014, he was fifth among all active ballplayers in career slugging percentage, and second among active left fielders in career fielding percentage.

==== 2015: All-Star ====
He was named NL Co-Player of the Week for May 17–24, along with the Pirates' Andrew McCutchen.

In 2015, Braun was named to the All-Star Team representing the National League. It was the sixth time he was selected as an All-Star, a team record, surpassing the prior record shared with Cecil Cooper and Paul Molitor.

On August 19, Braun hit his 252nd career home run during a game against the Miami Marlins, setting the all-time record for home runs in Milwaukee Brewers franchise history. The record was previously held by Robin Yount.

For the season, Braun batted .285 with a .498 slugging percentage (9th in the league), and 25 home runs, 84 RBIs, and 24 stolen bases (8th in the NL; his 85.71 stolen base percentage was 5th in the league), with a 24.5 power-speed number (3rd in the league) and a .991 fielding percentage (2nd in the league for right fielders). It was his fourth 20/20 season, and only three other players in the majors had one in 2015. He was named Brewers Most Valuable Player, for the third time, by the Milwaukee Chapter of the Baseball Writers' Association of America. He was also the Brewers' nominee for the Hank Aaron Award.

==== 2016–2017 ====
In 2016, Braun batted .305 (10th in the National League) with a .538 slugging percentage (8th) and .903 OPS (9th), and 30 home runs (his 6th 30+ HR season), 91 RBIs (his 7th 90+ RBI season), and 16 stolen bases. His 12 assists as a left fielder were 2nd in the league (as he led the NL with 3 double plays from left field), he was second among league left fielders in fielding percentage at .987, his 10 intentional walks were 6th in the NL, and his 20.9 power-speed # was 7th. He tied the Brewers record and his career high (2x) with 7 RBIs on August 6. He was named Brewers Most Valuable Player, for the fourth time, by the Milwaukee Chapter of the Baseball Writers' Association of America. He was also the Brewers' nominee for the Hank Aaron Award and the Roberto Clemente Award.

On July 14, 2017, Braun hit his sixth career grand slam, breaking a tie with Cecil Cooper, John Jaha, and Jeromy Burnitz for the most in Brewers history. He became the only active player to lead his team's all-time list in the category.

On September 8, Braun hit his 300th career home run, the first Brewer to do so. With the home run he became the 6th baseball player to have at least 300 home runs and 180 stolen bases in his first 11 big league seasons, joining Willie Mays (368 HRs, 240 SB), Reggie Jackson (313 HRs, 188 SB), Barry Bonds (334 HRs, 380 SB), Sammy Sosa (336 HRs, 224 SB), and Alex Rodriguez (381 HRs, 205 SB). For the season, he batted .268/.336/.487 with 17 home runs and 52 RBIs, after being limited to 104 games and 380 at bats due to calf and wrist injuries.

==== 2018–2019 ====
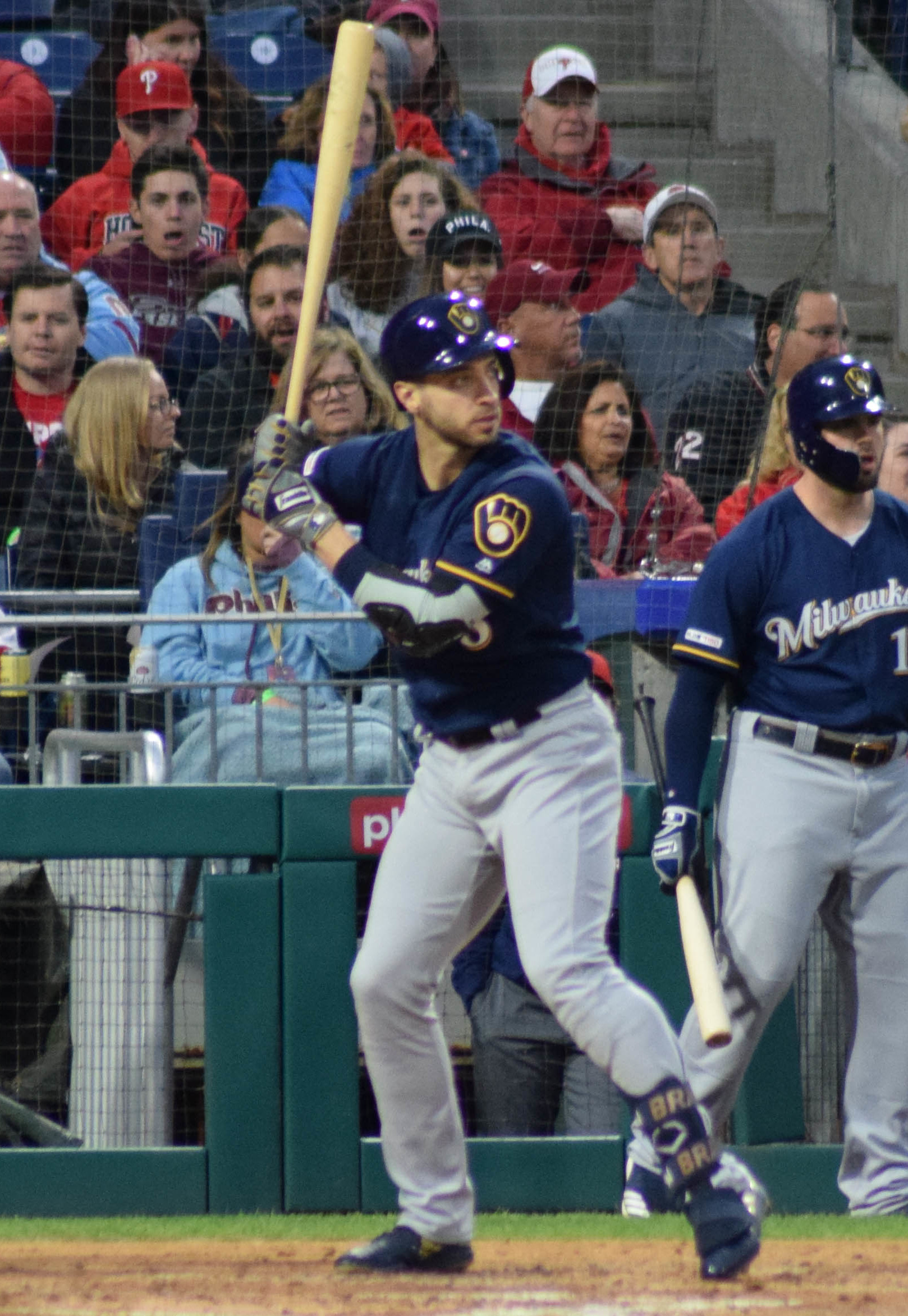
Braun at bat with the Brewers in 2019

After the Brewers acquired outfielders Christian Yelich and Lorenzo Cain, they announced that they intended to have Braun play some first base during the season to ease their logjam in the outfield. For the season, he played 93 games in left field and 18 at first base.

On April 19, Braun hit a pinch-hit, three-run home run for his 1,000th career RBI. He became the 9th active ballplayer, and the 284th in Major League history, to reach that number. In Brewers' history, only Robin Yount has had more RBIs (1,406). For the season, he batted .254/.313/.469 with 20 home runs and 64 RBIs, in 405 at bats.

After the regular season, he became the team's all-time postseason hits leader, passing Yount and Molitor, with five hits in the NL Division Series. Braun batted .385 in the 2018 National League Division Series, bringing his career division series batting average to .404, tied for sixth-best all-time.

Braun made his 12th career Opening Day start, tying Paul Molitor for second in team history, behind only Robin Yount (19). On April 6, 2019, Braun scored his 1,000th career run (third-most in Brewers history, behind Molitor (1,275) and Yount (1,632)). He was the only player of the nine active major league players with 1,000 runs scored to have scored them all for one team.

On May 4, Braun had the first 6-hit game of his career, tying the Brewers record, in an 18-inning game against the New York Mets, in which he drove in the winning run. On September 25 he hit his eighth career grand slam, a Brewers record. For the season, he batted .285/.343/.505 with 22 home runs and 75 RBIs, while stealing 11 bases in 12 attempts, in 459 at bats. It was his 10th career 20+ home run season.

The Milwaukee Journal Sentinel named him the Brewers' 2010s Player of the Decade.

==== 2020–2021 ====
Brewers manager Craig Counsell said that during the 2020 season Braun would spend some time at DH, and would also play right field and first base. Braun entered the final guaranteed year of his contract, as he and the Brewers had a $15 million mutual option for 2021, with a $4 million buyout. On September 16, Braun hit his 350th career home run, and was fifth in homers among all active players, and tied for 95th among MLB's all-time home run hitters (one behind Dick Allen). In the pandemic-shortened 2020 regular season, Braun slashed .233/.281/.488 with 8 home runs and 26 RBIs in 129 at bats. In October, the Brewers opted to pay Braun the $4 million buyout rather than exercising the $15 million option, making him a free agent for the first time in his career.

After not playing during the 2021 season, Braun announced his retirement on September 14, 2021.

=== Performance-enhancing drugs ===
==== Disputed testosterone test ====
On December 10, 2011, the results of a confidential urine test conducted on Braun in October 2011 were leaked to ESPN's Outside the Lines. ESPN reported that Braun had tested positive for an elevated level of testosterone caused by a performance-enhancing drug and faced a 50-game suspension. The Daily News quoted a source who said that the test results were "insanely high, the highest ever for anyone who has ever taken a test, twice the level of the highest test ever taken".

Braun appealed the positive drug test in January 2012. He contended that the test collector, Dino Laurenzi Jr., was an anti-Semite who mishandled his urine sample. Under MLB's drug-testing program, samples should be sent to the laboratory on the same day they are collected "absent unusual circumstance". Braun's sample was collected and sealed on a Saturday. Laurenzi stated that no FedEx delivery center was open; therefore, he followed protocol, stored the samples in a Rubbermaid container, and dropped them off at an open FedEx center on Monday. Braun pointed out there were at least five FedEx locations within five miles that were open until 9 p.m., as well as a 24-hour location. MLB argued that there was no evidence of tampering of the sample, and the United States Anti-Doping Agency said the testosterone levels in the samples would not grow in a refrigerator over a weekend. A second test conducted by an independent laboratory showed normal testosterone levels.

On February 22, 2012, a three-member panel overturned the test results by a vote of two to one. It was the first time that an MLB player had successfully challenged a drug test result. The arbitration panel, consisting of MLB representative Rob Manfred, players' union lawyer Michael Weiner, and arbitrator Shyam Das, determined that Braun had raised valid questions about the manner in which Laurenzi had handled his sample. The New York Times wrote that Braun "won on a technicality.

Braun expressed relief at the panel's decision, saying, "'We were able to get through this because I am innocent and the truth is on our side'". Braun added, "'There were a lot of things that we learned about the collector, about the collection process, about the way that the entire thing worked, that made us very concerned and very suspicious about what could have actually happened.'"

==== Links to Biogenesis clinic and MLB suspension ====
In February 2013, Yahoo! Sports reported that Braun's name appeared three times in records of Biogenesis of America, a Coral Gables clinic alleged to have distributed performance-enhancing drugs to a number of Major League Baseball players who tested positive for banned substances. One entry noted that Braun owed the clinic between $20,000 and $30,000. Braun's name was not listed next to any specific PEDs, unlike some of the other players mentioned in the records. Braun released a statement maintaining that his attorneys had retained the clinic's operator, Anthony Bosch, as a consultant during his appeal of his positive drug test the previous season, and denied any further dealings with the clinic.

Later that month, ESPN's Outside the Lines obtained a new Biogenesis document from April 2012 listing Braun among three other MLB players with the notation: "MLB Ryan Braun + 1500." An ESPN source said to be familiar with Bosch's operation claimed the list was of players who obtained PEDs from Bosch and their respective balances, with a circle around the plus sign next to a player's name indicating his balance was paid off. In late April, Bosch confirmed to ESPN that Braun's legal team merely consulted with him during Braun's appeal, and confirmed that he never spoke to Braun himself.

On June 4, 2013, ESPN reported that MLB was preparing suspensions for players linked to using PEDs provided by Biogenesis of America and Bosch. ESPN reported that Braun could have been suspended for as many as 100 games if found guilty, although the appeals process could have taken months and would not have yielded a suspension until 2014.

On July 22, 2013, MLB suspended Braun for the remaining 65 games of the regular season, plus the entire postseason, for his involvement with the Biogenesis clinic. Braun, who lost $3.25 million as a result, did not appeal the suspension. In a statement, he said, "I realize now that I have made some mistakes. I am willing to accept the consequences of those actions." ESPN reported that Braun decided to "strike a deal" with MLB after being presented with the evidence against him. Called a "liar," he was heavily criticized by the media and other players, particularly for tarnishing Laurenzi's reputation. In particular, it was later exposed that Braun engaged in a campaign for support from players around the league.

Although the standard suspension for a first offense under MLB's drug policy was, at that time, 50 games, Braun was suspended an additional 15 games for his actions during and after his appeal of the 2011 test. According to the Milwaukee Journal-Sentinel, MLB officials were particularly angered by a speech Braun made during 2012 spring training in which he attacked Laurenzi's integrity (suggesting that he tampered with the test because he supported the rival Chicago Cubs or was personally anti-Semitic) and the integrity of the drug program as a whole. MLB considered Braun's speech, as well as his earlier attacks on Laurenzi, to be conduct detrimental to baseball—an offense punishable under the collective bargaining agreement, not the drug policy. Braun accepted the additional suspension without appeal because of overwhelming evidence in the Biogenesis case.

==== Admission and apology ====
On August 22, 2013, Braun released a statement in which he apologized for using PEDs. He claimed to have used PEDs during the latter part of the 2011 season to help him recover from a nagging injury. Braun said that using PEDs was "a huge mistake," adding that he had "compounded the situation by not admitting my mistakes immediately". Braun also apologized to Laurenzi, stating that he "deeply regretted" the comments he had made about him.

== International career ==
Braun was invited to play for Team USA in 2009 in the second World Baseball Classic. "I'm really excited to get to represent my country", he said. "It's an honor just to get invited for the event." He batted .381 as the team's starting left fielder, helping it reach the semi-finals.

== Player profile ==
=== Hitting ===
"He looks like 'The Natural.'"

— Jim Powell, former Brewers' radio voice

Braun had the ability to hit for average and significant power. His swing was compact and short, with high bat speed and a protracted follow-through. Braun waited well on offspeed pitches and hit the ball to all fields. He was able to drive the ball regardless of where in the strike zone it was pitched. Brewers hitting coach Jim Skaalen observed: "He's got tremendously quick hands and really hits through the ball. He stays on the ball as well as anyone we've got."

=== Speed ===
Braun's speed garnered him comparisons to New York Yankees third baseman Alex Rodriguez. Braun has been timed at 4.2 seconds to first base from the right side of the plate. In spring training in 2007, he was second-fastest in the Brewers' 60-yard dash.

=== Defense ===
==== Third base ====
A shortstop most of his early life and in college, Braun was inconsistent on defense after switching to third base in 2006. However, he was noted for his athleticism, his occasional web gems, and particularly for his powerful throwing arm, which was rated the best infield arm in the Brewers' minor league system by Baseball America in early 2007. Braun was charged with 34 errors in 2006, the majority on throws. "It's a matter of proper footwork", said Ash in early 2007. "Most of his problems come because he relies on his arm, which is very strong."

"I think Braunie's biggest problem is reading the ball off the bat. He's gotten a lot better on the routine plays, has gotten a lot better with his throws. He's a very good athlete. He's working very hard at it. He's going to get better, no doubt about it. He hasn't played a lot of third base. We tend to forget that."

— Brewers coach Dale Sveum, a former big league third baseman

While Yost removed Braun from a number of games in September 2007 for defense, he praised Braun for his improvements. "The great thing about it is it doesn't involve throwing at all now", said Yost, referring to Braun's biggest issue in the spring. "It involves first-step quickness to the ball, which will increase his range. [He needs to] soften his hands a little bit. [His] hand-eye coordination to the ball needs to be a little better. That comes with repetition, repetition, repetition." Braun finished 2007 last of all eligible third basemen in fielding percentage (.895, with 26 errors; only the fourth third baseman since 1916 to play 100 games or more in a season and have a fielding percentage under .900), range factor (2.11), and zone rating (.697). His target at first base was Prince Fielder, who finished 2007 last of all eligible major league first basemen in range factor (8.49), and first in errors (14). Similarly, his target at second base, Rickie Weeks, had the lowest fielding percentage of all NL second basemen (.976), and the lowest zone rating among all major league second basemen (.737).

It was suggested that it was possible that Braun would learn to play the position adequately, given that David Wright had once led MLB in errors at the position before going on to win a Gold Glove, an award that Braun would never be considered for.

Braun, for his part, noted after the 2007 season: "It's only my second full (professional) year of playing third base. I don't expect to be perfect, but I certainly expect to be better than I have been. I have to continue to work hard, and hopefully I'll improve."

==== Left field ====
In January 2008, however, the Brewers acquired three-time Gold Glove-winning center fielder Mike Cameron, prompting the team to move center fielder Bill Hall to third base and Braun to left field.

Before the news broke, Braun was taking ground balls at Pepperdine University near Los Angeles. General Manager Doug Melvin left him a voicemail, and after returning the call and learning of the team's plans Braun grabbed his outfield glove, and started taking fly balls. Braun supported the switch. "[The outfield glove] is not broken in yet, but it will get there. I feel like I'm a good enough athlete and have a good enough work ethic to make the transition pretty easily."

While Braun's outfield experience until then had consisted of "two games in center field my freshman year in high school," Braun had speed, arm strength that would make him stand out against other left fielders, and athleticism to make the transition. Early reports were good, as in spring training in 2008 he showed an ability to cover ground, go back on the ball, to his left into the gap, and to his right to cut off balls down the line. Braun looked good tracking liners and high fly balls, and took good routes when cutting off balls down the line or in the gap, holding batters to singles. In March 2008 Manager Ned Yost said that Braun has been "spectacular" in left, and "he's got an opportunity one day to win a Gold Glove in left field. He certainly does."

In July, by which time Braun was being mentioned in the press as a Gold Glove candidate, Ed Sedar, the Brewers' outfield defense expert, said: "He probably has the best arm in baseball in left field. He can cover more ground than 90% of the outfielders out there."

In 2008, Braun led all major league outfielders with a 1.000 fielding percentage. He also led all NL left fielders in putouts (275), and was second in the league in range factor (1.95) and fourth in assists (9), in 1,310.1 innings.

On May 23, 2009, Braun was charged with his first error ever in 190 games in left field, when his throw to third was not caught by either Bill Hall or Craig Counsell, one of whom should have caught it according to Manager Ken Macha, but both of whom were confused as to who was covering the base. In July 2009, ESPN's Jon Heyman wrote that Braun had "become a terrific left fielder in no time". Braun led all NL left fielders in 2009 with a .994 fielding percentage. He also led them in putouts (304) and range factor (2.06), was tied for the lead in double plays (2), and was third in assists (8), in 1,364 innings.

In 2010, Braun led NL left fielders in putouts for the third year in a row (279), was second in range factor per game (1.86), and 4th in assists (6).

== Jewish heritage ==
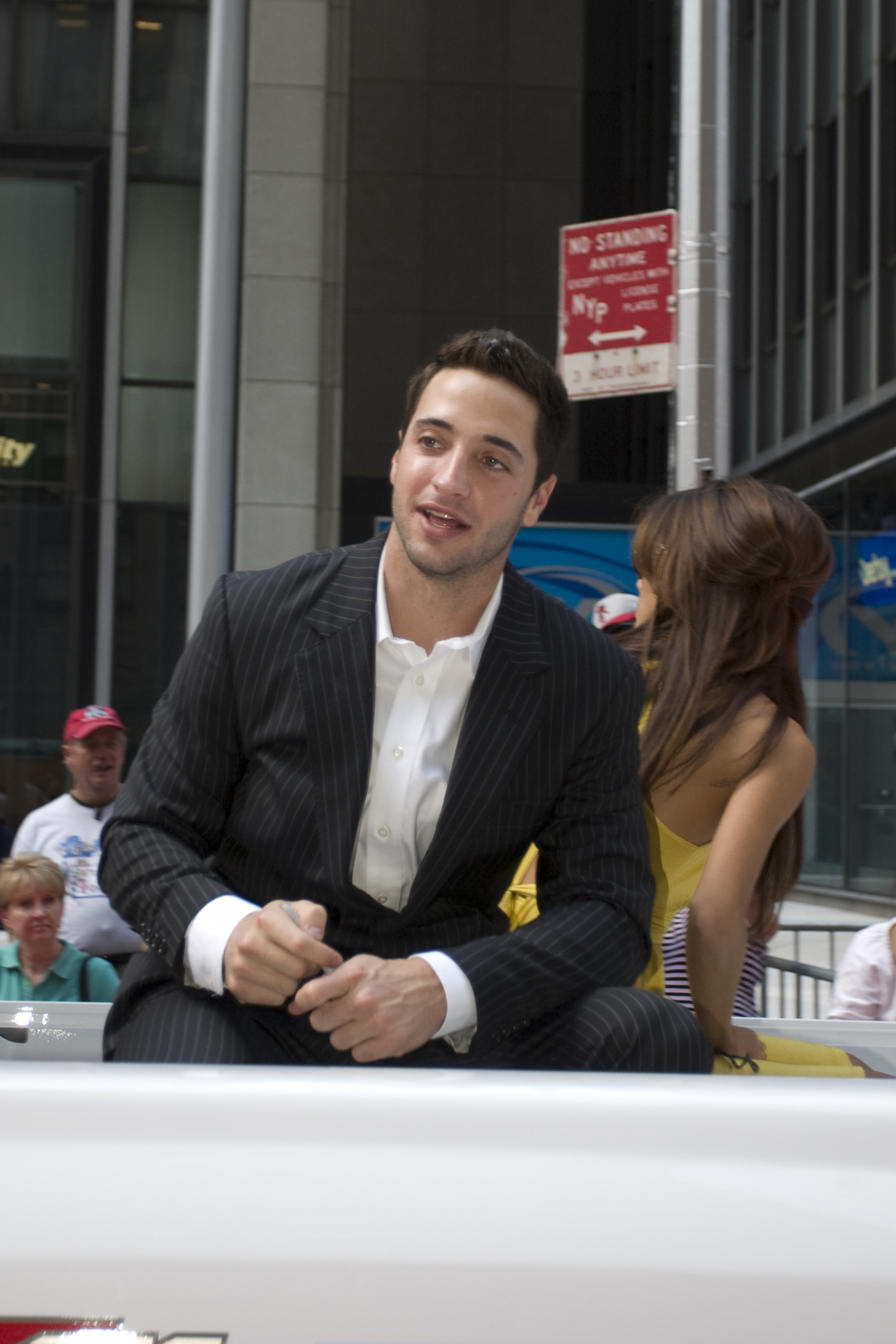
Braun in 2008

Braun's father Joe, most of whose side of the family was murdered in the Holocaust, was born in Israel. His father immigrated to the United States at age seven. His father is Jewish and his mother Diane is Catholic.

Braun has stated that he is Jewish, and has added that he is "extremely proud to be a role model for young Jewish kids". Braun has also noted that he does not wish to make his Jewish identity "'into something more than what it is. I didn't have a Bar Mitzvah.... I didn't celebrate the holidays'".

Braun is one of the highest-drafted Jewish ballplayers in the history of professional baseball. Braun was considered the best Jewish minor league baseball prospect in 2006, and became major league baseball's first Jewish Rookie of the Year the following season. In each of 2007 and 2008, Braun hit more home runs (34 and 37) than all but 3 of the top 10 career Jewish home run hitters had hit in their best seasons. Only Hank Greenberg (58), Shawn Green (49), and Al Rosen (43) hit more in a single year. On June 8, 2019, he hit his 332nd home run, passing Hank Greenberg to become the all-time Jewish career home run leader.

"Braun" was, coincidentally, the family name of Sandy Koufax, until his mother remarried and he took his stepfather's name. "There's no [family] connection that I know of", Braun said, "but it's kind of cool." In another coincidence, Braun lived for a time with his maternal grandfather in a house that previously belonged to Jewish Hall of Fame first baseman Hank Greenberg. Braun's grandfather has lived in the house for over 40 years.

In December 2007, Braun was the only Jewish athlete invited by President George W. Bush to the annual Hanukkah Dinner at the White House, where he talked baseball with the president. Braun was later featured in the 2008 Hank Greenberg 75th Anniversary edition of Jewish Major Leaguers Baseball Cards, published in affiliation with Fleer Trading Cards and the American Jewish Historical Society, commemorating the Jewish Major Leaguers from 1871 through 2008. Braun was one of three Jewish players in the 2008 All-Star Game and one of three Jewish players on the Team USA 2009 World Baseball Classic team. He and Rangers pitcher Scott Feldman were voted the 2009 co-Jewish MVP by Jewish Major Leaguers, and he was voted the 2010 Jewish MVP as Breslow received the Most Valuable Jewish Pitcher honors. "There aren't too many Jewish athletes at the highest level", said Braun. "It's something that I certainly embrace."

Braun was inducted into the Southern California Jewish Sports Hall of Fame in January 2010.

The Jewish Daily Forward listed him as number five in the 2011 "Forward 50", its list of the 50 most significant American Jews.

In 2011, Braun became the fourth Jewish player to win the Most Valuable Player Award, after Greenberg (1935 and 1940), Rosen (1953), and Koufax (1963). In April 2012, Shalom Life ranked him Number 5 on its list of "the 50 most talented, intelligent, funny, and gorgeous Jewish men in the world."

== Outside pursuits ==
Braun developed a signature fashion T-shirt line for Affliction Clothing, a California-based clothing manufacturer. In August 2008, he filmed a YouTube video with model Marisa Miller for Remington's ShortCut clippers. In October 2008, Apple released a commercial for a new iPhone, that showed a clip of Braun's 10th-inning walk-off grand slam against the Pittsburgh Pirates on September 25, 2008, which kept the Brewers' Wild Card hopes alive. Gatorade used the same clip in its November 2008 "League of Clutch" commercial.

Braun has signed endorsement deals with CytoSport (a supplement maker), Nike, Wilson, Mikita Sports for autographs and memorabilia, Sam Bat, and AirTran Airways, and is working on his own line of aluminum bats. He has appeared in commercials for Muscle Milk, Dick's Sporting Goods, and regional convenience store chain Kwik Trip. He turned down a request by ABC that he appear on the TV show The Bachelor.

In 2010, Braun opened two restaurants in Wisconsin, Ryan Braun's Waterfront in Milwaukee's Historic Third Ward and Ryan Braun's Tavern & Grill in Lake Geneva. In late 2010, Braun's Milwaukee location closed for remodeling and re-opened in April 2011 as Ryan Braun's Graffito, an Italian restaurant. In July 2012, Braun teamed up with Green Bay Packers quarterback Aaron Rodgers to open a restaurant, 8-Twelve, in Brookfield, Wisconsin.

Braun lost endorsement deals with Kwik Trip and Nike in 2013 after he was suspended for using performance-enhancing drugs. In September 2013, SURG Restaurant Group, which manages Ryan Braun's Graffito Restaurant and 8-Twelve MVP Bar & Grill, announced that it would end its relationship with Braun. 8-Twelve MVP Bar & Grill changed its name to "Hom" after losing its affiliation with Braun. Graffito closed in October of that year.

Braun and his wife, Larisa, have three children: a daughter who was born in September 2014, a son who was born in September 2017, and another son who was born in May 2020.

== See also ==
- List of Jewish Major League Baseball players
- List of Major League Baseball annual home run leaders
- List of Major League Baseball annual runs scored leaders
- List of Major League Baseball career home run leaders
- List of Major League Baseball players suspended for performance-enhancing drugs
- List of Major League Baseball players who spent their entire career with one franchise

Awards
| Preceded by Hunter Pence; Ryan Braun | NL Rookie of the Month; June 2007; July 2007 | Succeeded by Ryan Braun; Troy Tulowitzki |
| Preceded by Alfonso Soriano; Hanley Ramírez | NL Player of the Month; July 2007; July 2008 | Succeeded by Mark Teixeira; Manny Ramírez |
| Preceded by Jorge Cantú; Carlos Gonzalez | NL Player of the Week; May 4–10, 2009; August 2–8, 2010 | Succeeded by Raúl Ibañez; Mike Stanton |
| Preceded by Justin Verlander | Baseball America Rookie of the Year; 2007 | Succeeded by Geovany Soto |
| Preceded by Dan Uggla | Sporting News NL Rookie of the Year; 2007 | Succeeded by Geovany Soto |
| Preceded by Dan Uggla | Players Choice NL Most Outstanding Rookie; 2007 | Succeeded by Geovany Soto |
| Preceded by Hanley Ramírez | Baseball Prospectus Internet Baseball NL Rookie of the Year; 2007 | Succeeded by Geovany Soto |
| Preceded by Ryan Zimmerman | Topps Rookie All-Star Third Baseman; 2007 | Succeeded by Evan Longoria |
| Preceded by Carlos Beltrán; Barry Bonds; Ken Griffey Jr. | NL All-Star Outfielder Starter; 2008 | Succeeded by Ryan Braun; Raúl Ibañez; Shane Victorino |
| Preceded by Ryan Braun; Kosuke Fukudome; Alfonso Soriano | NL All-Star Outfielder Starter; 2009 | Succeeded by Ryan Braun; Carlos Beltrán; Raúl Ibañez |
| Preceded by Ryan Braun; Raúl Ibañez; Shane Victorino | NL All-Star Outfielder Starter; 2010 | Succeeded by Incumbent |
| Preceded by Matt Holliday; Carlos Lee; Aaron Rowand | Sporting News All-Star Outfielder; 2008 | Succeeded by Ryan Braun; Matt Kemp; Jayson Werth |
| Preceded by Ryan Braun; Matt Holliday; Ryan Ludwick | Sporting News All-Star Outfielder; 2009 | Succeeded by Ryan Braun; Carlos González; Matt Holliday |
| Preceded by Ryan Braun; Matt Kemp; Jayson Werth | Sporting News All-Star Outfielder; 2010 | Succeeded by Incumbent |
