= Jordany Valdespin =

Dominican baseball player (born 1987)

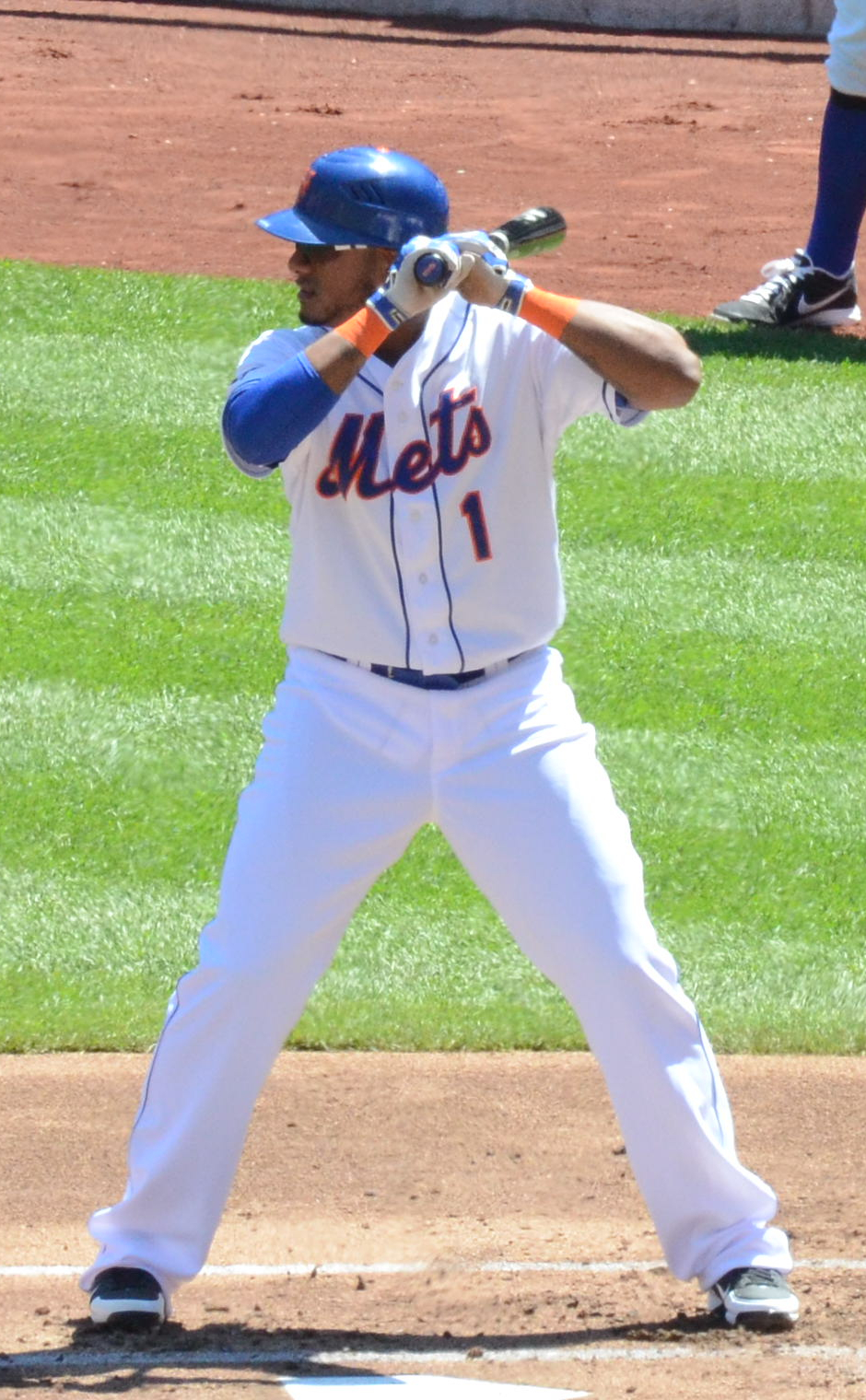
- Valdespin with the New York Mets in 2012
- Second baseman / Outfielder
- Born: December 23, 1987 (age 38); San Pedro de Macoris, Dominican Republic
- Batted: Left Threw: Right

MLB debut
- April 23, 2012, for the New York Mets

Last MLB appearance
- July 10, 2015, for the Miami Marlins

MLB statistics
- Batting average: .216
- Home runs: 15
- Runs batted in: 52
- Stats at Baseball Reference

Teams
- New York Mets (2012–2013); Miami Marlins (2014–2015)

Jordany V. Valdespin (born December 23, 1987) is a Dominican former professional baseball second baseman and outfielder. He played in Major League Baseball (MLB) for the New York Mets and Miami Marlins. He was suspended for 50 games during the 2013 Biogenesis baseball scandal.

== Professional career ==
=== New York Mets ===
Valdespin began his professional career in 2007, playing for the Dominican Summer League Mets. That year, he hit .245 with one home run and 16 RBIs in 43 games. In 2008, he played for the Gulf Coast League Mets, hitting .284 with three home runs and 22 RBIs in 34 games. He split 2009 between the DSL Mets, GCL Mets, Brooklyn Cyclones and Savannah Sand Gnats, hitting a combined .298 with four home runs, 28 RBIs and 13 stolen bases in 67 games. He split 2010 between the St. Lucie Mets and Binghamton Mets, hitting a combined .272 with six home runs, 41 RBIs and 17 stolen bases in 93 games. In 2011, Valdespin hit .294 with 17 home runs, 60 RBIs and 37 stolen bases in the Mets minor league system.

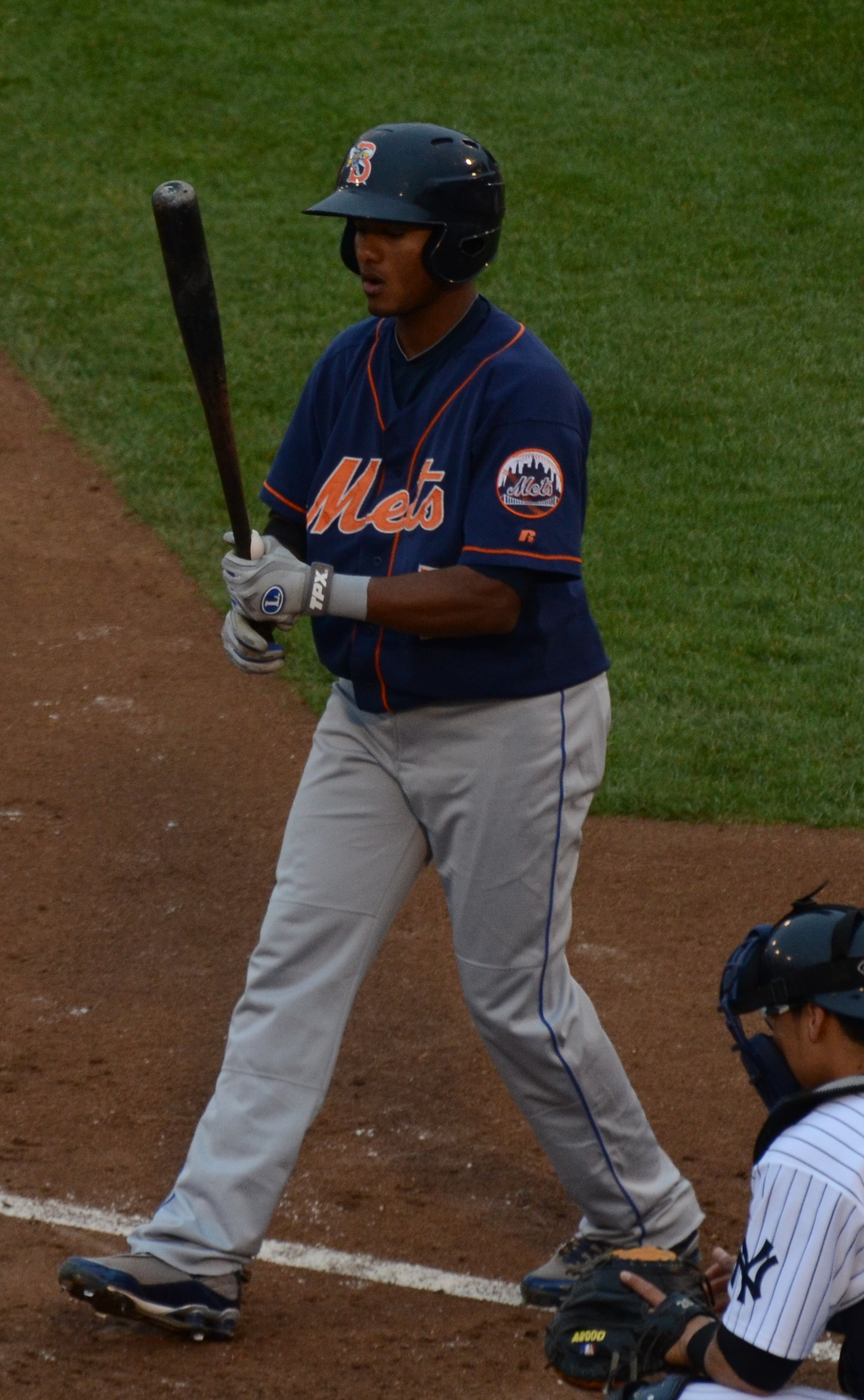
Jordany Valdespin with the Binghamton Mets in 2011

==== 2012 season ====
On April 23, 2012, Valdespin was called up for the second game in a doubleheader versus the San Francisco Giants. In his debut, Valdespin pinch hit for Manny Acosta in the 8th inning. He started his first major league game on April 27, playing left field and batting 8th against the Miami Marlins. While pinch hitting on May 7, Valdespin collected his first major league hit on a three-run home run against Jonathan Papelbon of the Philadelphia Phillies to break a tie in the 9th inning. That same hit made Valdespin the first player in MLB history to ever record his first hit as a home run off a player who has 200 or more career saves. On July 24, he broke a Mets franchise record by hitting his fifth pinch-hit home run of the season, off of Ryan Mattheus of the Washington Nationals. On August 26, Valdespin was optioned to Triple-A but was recalled on September 4.

==== 2013 season ====
Valdespin made the Opening Day roster for the Mets and was set to platoon in center field with Collin Cowgill. On April 24, 2013, Valdespin hit a walk-off grand slam, the first Met to do so since Kevin McReynolds hit one on June 25, 1991, against the Montreal Expos.

On July 15, Valdespin was sent down to the AAA Las Vegas 51s after hitting only .188 that season, leading to a confrontation with manager Terry Collins in which Valdespin referred to his skipper as a "cocksucker" before demanding to be placed on the disabled list. This followed several incidents of showboating, most recently on May 11 and 12 when he celebrated a home run he hit while down four runs in one game, and was hit by a pitch during a pinch hit appearance the next day in retaliation.

On August 5, Valdespin was suspended for 50 games from baseball for using performance-enhancing drugs obtained from Biogenesis. He was reinstated on September 25, and assigned to Triple-A. After the season, Valdespin was non-tendered by the Mets, making him a free agent.

=== Miami Marlins ===
On December 20, 2013, the Miami Marlins signed Valdespin to a minor league contract. He was called up to the Marlins on July 19, 2014. He was outrighted off the roster on October 10, 2014. During the 2015 season, Valdespin hit .293 (75-for-256) with two home runs and 20 RBIs in 76 games for the Triple-A New Orleans Zephyrs.

=== Detroit Tigers ===
On December 23, 2015, the Detroit Tigers signed Valdespin to a minor league contract. In 101 games for the Triple–A Toledo Mud Hens, he batted .239/.292/.321 with three home runs, 25 RBI, and 10 stolen bases. Valdespin elected free agency following the season on November 7, 2016.

=== Leones de Yucatán ===
On February 2, 2017, Valdespin signed with the Leones de Yucatán of the Mexican League. In 14 games for Yucatán, he hit .292/.433/.396 with no home runs and 13 RBI. Valdespin was released by the Leones on April 18.

=== Olmecas de Tabasco ===
On April 21, 2017, Valdespin signed with the Olmecas de Tabasco of the Mexican League. In 58 games for Tabasco, he batted .341/.415/.470 with four home runs, 24 RBI, and 14 stolen bases. Valdespin was released by the Olmecas on July 5.

=== Long Island Ducks ===
On March 15, 2018, Valdespin signed with the Long Island Ducks of the Atlantic League of Professional Baseball. He hit .338/.399/.487 with 12 home runs, 30 stolen bases and a league-leading 94 runs scored. He also led the league in triples (7) and hits (154). Despite coming up just short of winning the ALPB Batting Title, Valdespin was named the 2018 Independent Leagues Player of the Year by Baseball America.

=== Minnesota Twins ===
On January 25, 2019, Valdespin signed a minor league deal with the Minnesota Twins that included an invitation to spring training. He started the 2019 season with the Rochester Red Wings. Valdespin was released on August 9, 2019.

On January 7, 2020, Valdespin signed with the Toros de Tijuana of the Mexican League. Valdespin did not play in a game in 2020 due to the cancellation of the Mexican League season because of the COVID-19 pandemic. He later became a free agent.

=== Lexington Legends ===
On March 4, 2022, Valdespin signed with the Lexington Legends of the Atlantic League of Professional Baseball. In 24 games for Lexington, he slashed .296/.398/.380 with one home run, 8 RBI, and three stolen bases. Valdespin was released by the Legends on August 9.
