= Malignant transformation =

Process whereby cells acquire the properties of cancer

Malignant transformation is the process by which cells acquire the properties of cancer. This may occur as a primary process in normal tissue, or secondarily as malignant degeneration of a previously existing benign tumor.

== Causes of cancer ==
There are many causes of primary malignant transformation, or tumorigenesis. Most human cancers in the United States are caused by external factors, and these factors are largely avoidable. These factors were summarized by Doll and Peto in 1981, and were still considered to be valid in 2015. These factors are listed in the table.

External factors in cancer
Factor	Estimated percent of cancer deaths
Diet	35
Tobacco	30
Infection	10
Reproductive and sexual behavior^{a}	7
Occupation	4
Alcohol	3
Sunlight (UV)	3
Pollution	2
Medicines and medical procedures	1
Food additives	<1
Industrial products	<1

^{a} Reproductive and sexual behaviors include: number of partners; age at first menstruation; zero versus one or more live births

=== Examples of diet-related malignant transformation ===
==== Diet and colon cancer ====
Colon cancer provides one example of the mechanisms by which diet, the top factor listed in the table, is an external factor in cancer. The Western diet of African Americans in the United States is associated with a yearly colon cancer rate of 65 per 100,000 individuals, while the high fiber/low fat diet of rural Native Africans in South Africa is associated with a yearly colon cancer rate of <5 per 100,000. Feeding the Western diet for two weeks to rural South Africans increased their secondary bile acids (including the carcinogenic deoxycholic acid) by 400%, and also changed the colonic microbiota. Evidence reviewed by Sun and Kato indicates that differences in human colonic microbiota play an important role in the progression of colon cancer.

==== Diet and lung cancer ====
A second example, relating a dietary component to a cancer, is illustrated by lung cancer. Two large population-based studies were performed, one in Italy and one in the United States. In Italy, the study population consisted of two cohorts: the first, 1721 individuals diagnosed with lung cancer and no severe disease, and the second, 1918 control individuals with absence of lung cancer history or any advanced diseases. All individuals filled out a food frequency questionnaire including consumption of walnuts, hazelnuts, almonds, and peanuts, and indicating smoking status. In the United States, 495,785 members of AARP were questioned on consumption of peanuts, walnuts, seeds, or other nuts in addition to other foods and smoking status. In this U.S. study 18,533 incident lung cancer cases were identified during up to 16 years of follow-up. Overall, individuals in the highest quintile of frequency of nut consumption had a 26% lower risk of lung cancer in the Italian study and a 14% lower risk of lung cancer in the U.S. study. Similar results were obtained among individuals who were smokers.

=== Due to tobacco ===
The most important chemical compounds in smoked tobacco that are carcinogenic are those that produce DNA damage since such damage appears to be the primary underlying cause of cancer. Cunningham et al. combined the microgram weight of the compound in the smoke of one cigarette with the known genotoxic effect per microgram to identify the most carcinogenic compounds in cigarette smoke. These compounds and their genotoxic effects are listed in the article Cigarette. The top three compounds are acrolein, formaldehyde and acrylonitrile, all known carcinogens.

=== Due to infection ===
==== Viruses ====
In 2002 the World Health Organizations International Agency for Research on Cancer estimated that 11.9% of human cancers are caused by one of seven viruses (see Oncovirus overview table). These are Epstein-Barr virus (EBV or HHV4); Kaposi's sarcoma-associated herpesvirus (KSHV or HHV8); Hepatitis B and Hepatitis C viruses (HBV and HCV); Human T-lymphotrophic virus 1 (HTLV-1); Merkel cell polyomavirus (MCPyV); and a group of alpha Human papillomaviruses (HPVs).

==== Bacteria ====
===== Helicobacter pylori and gastric cancer =====
In 1995 epidemiologic evidence indicated that Helicobacter pylori infection increases the risk for gastric carcinoma. More recently, experimental evidence showed that infection with Helicobacter pylori cagA-positive bacterial strains results in severe degrees of inflammation and oxidative DNA damage, leading to progression to gastric cancer.

===== Other bacterial roles in carcinogenesis =====
Perera et al. referred to a number of articles pointing to roles of bacteria in other cancers. They pointed to single studies on the role of Chlamydia trachomatis in cervical cancer, Salmonella typhi in gallbladder cancer, and both Bacteroides fragilis and Fusobacterium nucleatum in colon cancer. Meurman has recently summarized evidence connecting oral microbiota with carcinogenesis. Although suggestive, these studies need further confirmation.

=== Due to heavy metals ===
The heavy metals cadmium, arsenic and nickel are all carcinogenic when present above certain levels.

Cadmium is known to be carcinogenic, possibly due to reduction of DNA repair. Lei et al. evaluated five DNA repair genes in rats after exposure of the rats to low levels of cadmium. They found that cadmium caused repression of three of the DNA repair genes: XRCC1 needed for base excision repair, OGG1 needed for base excision repair, and ERCC1 needed for nucleotide excision repair. Repression of these genes was not due to methylation of their promoters.

Arsenic carcinogenicity was reviewed by Bhattacharjee et al. They summarized the role of arsenic and its metabolites in generating oxidative stress, resulting in DNA damage. In addition to causing DNA damage, arsenic also causes repression of several DNA repair enzymes in both the base excision repair pathway and the nucleotide excision repair pathway. Bhattacharjee et al. further reviewed the role of arsenic in causing telomere dysfunction, mitotic arrest, defective apoptosis, as well as altered promoter methylation and miRNA expression. Each of these alterations could contribute to arsenic-induced carcinogenesis.

Nickel compounds are carcinogenic and occupational exposure to nickel is associated with an increased risk of lung and nasal cancers. Nickel compounds exhibit weak mutagenic activity, but they considerably alter the transcriptional landscape of the DNA of exposed individuals. Arita et al. examined the peripheral blood mononuclear cells of eight nickel-refinery workers and ten non-exposed workers. They found 2756 differentially expressed genes with 770 up-regulated genes and 1986 down-regulated genes. DNA repair genes were significantly over-represented among the differentially expressed genes, with 29 DNA repair genes repressed in the nickel-refinery workers and two over-expressed. The alterations in gene expression appear to be due to epigenetic alterations of histones, methylations of gene promoters, and hypermethylation of at least microRNA miR-152.

== Common underlying factors in cancer ==
=== Mutations ===
One underlying commonality in cancers is genetic mutation, acquired either by inheritance, or, more commonly, by mutations in one's somatic DNA over time. The mutations considered important in cancers are those that alter protein coding genes (the exome). As Vogelstein et al. point out, a typical tumor contains two to eight exome "driver gene" mutations, and a larger number of exome mutations that are "passengers" that confer no selective growth advantage.

Cancers also generally have genome instability, that includes a high frequency of mutations in the noncoding DNA that makes up about 98% of the human genome. The average number of DNA sequence mutations in the entire genome of breast cancer tissue is about 20,000. In an average melanoma (where melanomas have a higher exome mutation frequency) the total number of DNA sequence mutations is about 80,000.

=== Epigenetic alterations ===
==== Transcription silencing ====
A second underlying commonality in cancers is altered epigenetic regulation of transcription. In cancers, loss of gene expression occurs about 10 times more frequently by epigenetic transcription silencing (caused, for example, by promoter hypermethylation of CpG islands) than by mutations. As Vogelstein et al. point out, in a colorectal cancer there are usually about 3 to 6 driver mutations and 33 to 66 hitchhiker, or passenger, mutations. In contrast, the frequency of epigenetic alterations is much higher. In colon tumors compared to adjacent normal-appearing colonic mucosa, there are about 600 to 800 heavily methylated CpG islands in promoters of genes in the tumors while the corresponding CpG islands are not methylated in the adjacent mucosa. Such methylation turns off expression of a gene as completely as a mutation would. Around 60–70% of human genes have a CpG island in their promoter region. In colon cancers, in addition to hypermethylated genes, several hundred other genes have hypomethylated (under-methylated) promoters, thereby causing these genes to be turned on when they ordinarily would be turned off.

==== Post-transcriptional silencing ====
Epigenetic alterations are also carried out by another major regulatory element, that of microRNAs (miRNAs). In mammals, these small non-coding RNA molecules regulate about 60% of the transcriptional activity of protein-encoding genes. Epigenetic silencing or epigenetic over-expression of miRNA genes, caused by aberrant DNA methylation of the promoter regions controlling their expression, is a frequent event in cancer cells. Almost one third of miRNA promoters active in normal mammary cells were found to be hypermethylated in breast cancer cells, and that is a several fold greater proportion of promoters with altered methylation than is usually observed for protein coding genes. Other microRNA promoters are hypomethylated in breast cancers, and, as a result, these microRNAs are over-expressed. Several of these over-expressed microRNAs have a major influence in progression to breast cancer. BRCA1 is normally expressed in the cells of breast and other tissue, where it helps repair damaged DNA, or destroy cells if DNA cannot be repaired. BRCA1 is involved in the repair of chromosomal damage with an important role in the error-free repair of DNA double-strand breaks. BRCA1 expression is reduced or undetectable in the majority of high grade, ductal breast cancers. Only about 3–8% of all women with breast cancer carry a mutation in BRCA1 or BRCA2. BRCA1 promoter hypermethylation was present in only 13% of unselected primary breast carcinomas. However, breast cancers were found to have an average of about 100-fold increase in miR-182, compared to normal breast tissue. In breast cancer cell lines, there is an inverse correlation of BRCA1 protein levels with miR-182 expression. Thus it appears that much of the reduction or absence of BRCA1 in high grade ductal breast cancers may be due to over-expressed miR-182. In addition to miR-182, a pair of almost identical microRNAs, miR-146a and miR-146b-5p, also repress BRCA1 expression. These two microRNAs are over-expressed in triple-negative tumors and their over-expression results in BRCA1 inactivation. Thus, miR-146a and/or miR-146b-5p may also contribute to reduced expression of BRCA1 in these triple-negative breast cancers.

Post-transcriptional regulation by microRNA occurs either through translational silencing of the target mRNA or through degradation of the target mRNA, via complementary binding, mostly to specific sequences in the three prime untranslated region of the target gene's mRNA. The mechanism of translational silencing or degradation of target mRNA is implemented through the RNA-induced silencing complex (RISC).

==== DNA repair gene silencing ====
Silencing of a DNA repair gene by hypermethylation or other epigenetic alteration appears to be a frequent step in progression to cancer. As summarized in a review, promoter hypermethylation of DNA repair gene MGMT occurs in 93% of bladder cancers, 88% of stomach cancers, 74% of thyroid cancers, 40%-90% of colorectal cancers and 50% of brain cancers. In addition, promoter hypermethylation of DNA repair genes LIG4, NEIL1, ATM, MLH1 or FANCB occurs at frequencies of between 33% and 82% in one or more of head and neck cancers, non-small-cell lung cancers or non-small-cell lung cancer squamous cell carcinomas. Further, the article Werner syndrome ATP-dependent helicase indicates the DNA repair gene WRN has a promoter that is often hypermethylated in a variety of cancers, with WRN hypermethylation occurring in 11% to 38% of colorectal, head and neck, stomach, prostate, breast, thyroid, non-Hodgkin lymphoma, chondrosarcoma and osteosarcoma cancers.

Such silencing likely acts similarly to a germ-line mutation in a DNA repair gene, and predisposes the cell and its descendants to progression to cancer. Another review points out that when a gene necessary for DNA repair is epigenetically silenced, DNA repair would tend to be deficient and DNA damages can accumulate. Increased DNA damage can cause increased errors during DNA synthesis, leading to mutations that give rise to cancer.

== Clinical signs ==
Malignant transformation of cells in a benign tumor may be detected by pathologic examination of tissues. Often the clinical signs and symptoms are suggestive of a malignant tumor. The physician, during the medical history examination, can find that there have been changes in size or patient sensation and, upon direct examination, that there has been a change in the lesion itself.

Risk assessments can be done and are known for certain types of benign tumor which are known to undergo malignant transformation. One of the better-known examples of this phenomenon is the progression of a nevus to melanoma.

== See also ==
- Abortive transformation
