= Thyroglobulin domain =

Thyroglobulin type-1 repeat
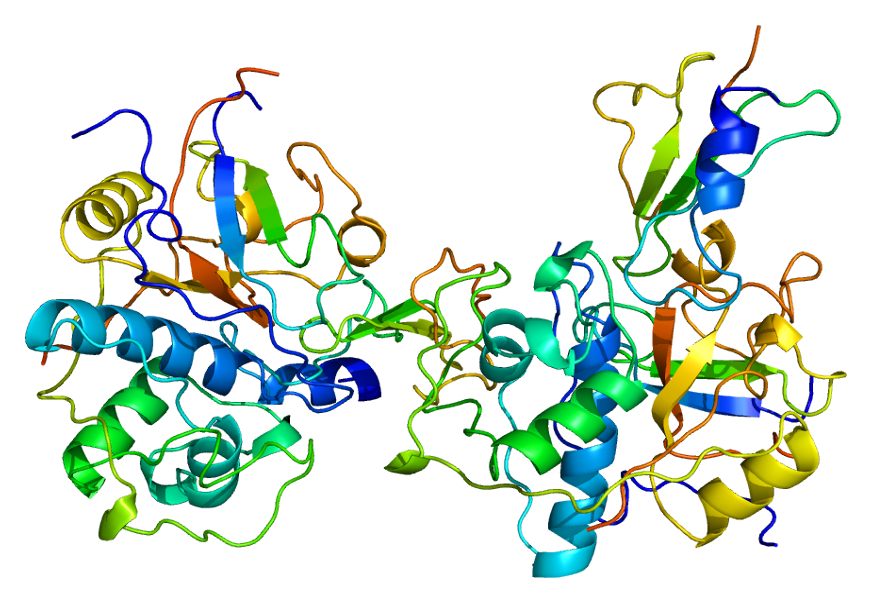
- Thyroglobulin type-1 domain

Identifiers
- Symbol: Thyroglobulin_1
- Pfam: PF00086
- InterPro: IPR000716
- PROSITE: PDOC00377
- SCOP2: 1icf / SCOPe / SUPFAM
- CDD: cd00191
Available protein structures:
- Pfam: structures / ECOD
- PDB: RCSB PDB; PDBe; PDBj
- PDBsum: structure summary
- PDB: 1icfI:213-271 1l3hA:213-271 1rmjA:163-234 1zt3A:176-251 1zt5A:176-251

Thyroglobulin type-1 repeat is an evolutionary conserved protein domain. Thyroglobulin type 1 repeats are thought to be involved in the control of proteolytic degradation. The domain usually contains six conserved cysteines. These form three disulphide bridges. Cysteines 1 pairs with 2, 3 with 4 and 5 with 6.

== Human proteins containing this domain ==
CD74; IGFBP-4; IGFBP1; IGFBP2; IGFBP3; IGFBP4; IGFBP5; IGFBP6; NID1; NID2; SMOC1; SMOC2; SPOCK1; SPOCK2; SPOCK3; TACSTD1; TACSTD2; TG;
