= Insulin-like growth factor–binding protein =

Transport protein for insulin-like growth factor 1

Insulin-like growth factor binding protein
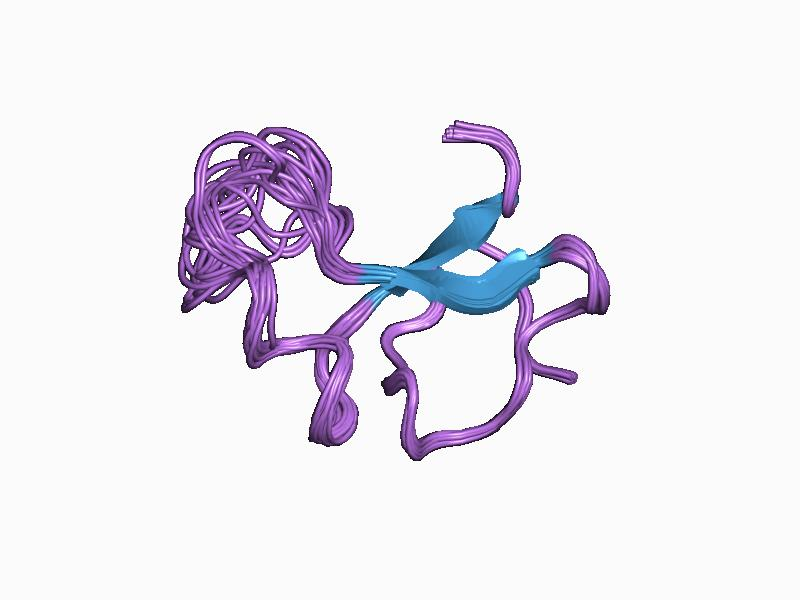
- Structure of the IGF-binding domain of the insulin-like growth factor-binding protein-5 (IGFBP-5)

Identifiers
- Symbol: IGFBP
- Pfam: PF00219
- InterPro: IPR000867
- SMART: SM00121
- PROSITE: PDOC00194
- SCOP2: 1boe / SCOPe / SUPFAM
Available protein structures:
- PDB: 1boe, 1h59 IPR000867 PF00219 (ECOD; PDBsum)
- AlphaFold: IPR000867; PF00219

The insulin-like growth factor-binding protein (IGFBP) serves as a transport protein for insulin-like growth factor 1 (IGF-1).

== Function ==
Approximately 98% of IGF-1 is always bound to one of six binding proteins (IGF-BP). IGFBP-3, the most abundant protein, accounts for 80% of all IGF binding. IGF-1 binds to IGFBP-3 in a 1:1 molar ratio. IGF-BP also binds to IGF-1 inside the liver, allowing growth hormone to continuously act upon the liver to produce more IGF-1.

IGF binding proteins (IGFBPs) are proteins of 24 to 45 kDa. All six IGFBPs share 50% homology with each other and have binding affinities for IGF-I and IGF-II at the same order of magnitude as the ligands have for the IGF-IR.

The IGFBPs help to lengthen the half-life of circulating IGFs in all tissues, including the prostate. Individual IGFBPs may act to enhance or attenuate IGF signaling depending on their physiological context (i.e. cell type). Even with these similarities, some characteristics are different: chromosomal location, heparin binding domains, RGD recognition site, preference for binding IGF-I or IGF-II, and glycosylation and phosphorylation differences. These structural differences can have a tremendous impact on how the IGFBPs interact with cellular basement membranes.

== Family members ==
In humans, IGFBPs are transcribed from the following seven genes:

- IGFBP1
- IGFBP2
- IGFBP3
- IGFBP4
- IGFBP5
- IGFBP6
- IGFBP7

== See also ==
- Insulin-like growth factor receptor
