= Regulator gene glucosyltransferases (Rgg/SHP) systems =

Rgg/SHP quorum sensing system

Regulator gene glucosyltransferases (Rgg, also sometimes known as Gad or Mut) are a family of cell signaling proteins in bacteria. Rgg proteins are part of the RRNPP superfamily of transcriptional regulators and are found in multiple Gram-positive Firmicutes bacteria, such as Streptococcus, Lactobacillus, and Listeria species. The Rgg family of proteins are quorum sensing systems that alter transcription levels by binding to DNA when the Rgg is bound to a cognate signaling Short Hydrophobic Peptide (SHP). The SHP acts as a pheromone (or autoinducer) and is generally secreted by peptidase-containing ABC transporters such as PptAB. It is thought that associated peptidases cleave the SHP into its active form upon secretion. This truncated SHP is then internalized by bacterial cells through a conserved oligopeptidase permease family. The internalized, active SHP then associates with Rgg to form a complex that binds to the promoter region of multiple genes and alters transcription. There can be several different Rgg/SHP paralogs present in a single bacterial strain, usually each with their own specific regulon. While it is theorized that each SHP can only bind to its associated Rgg, there is evidence in some species for crosstalk between different SHPs and Rggs.

== Structure ==
The structure of the Rgg/SHP complex has been determined by X-ray crystallography. Rggs typically exist in the cell as homodimers, and each monomer has two functional domains: an N-terminal DNA binding domain with a helix-turn-helix (HTH) motif, and a C-terminal peptide binding domain, where the SHP is bound. The SHP consists of an N-terminal secretion signal and a hydrophobic C-terminal region. It is proposed that the N-terminal region is required for exit from the cell, whereas the C-terminal region is necessary for Rgg binding.

== Function ==
The primary function of the Rgg/SHP system is to bind to DNA and regulate gene expression. Rgg/SHP systems can function as either transcriptional activators or repressors, depending on the DNA promoter sequence to which they bind. Activity of the Rgg/SHP systems are often highly dependent on the nutritional content of the surrounding environment.

== Regulons ==
Genes activated by Rgg/SHP systems are typically involved in population level behaviors and environmental adaptation. Rggs were first identified as regulators of expression for glucosyltransferases, but since have been linked to a variety of cellular processes such as the oxidative stress response and sugar metabolism. Several studies have also implicated Rgg/SHP systems in the virulence mechanisms of certain disease-causing bacterial species, such as Streptococcus pneumoniae and Streptococcus pyogenes. Depending on the bacterial species, Rgg/SHP systems are known to up-regulate genes involved in antibiotic resistance, colonization (biology), and biofilm formation.
