= Insulin-like growth factor receptor =

Receptor proteins for insulin-like growth factors

The insulin-like growth factor receptors (IGFRs) include the following two receptors:

- Insulin-like growth factor 1 receptor (IGF-1R)
- Insulin-like growth factor 2 receptor (IGF-2R)

== See also ==
- Insulin-like growth factor
- Insulin-like growth factor 1
- Insulin-like growth factor 2
- Insulin-like growth factor-binding protein
