= Epigenetics of cocaine addiction =

Field of study

Cocaine addiction is the compulsive use of cocaine despite adverse consequences. It arises through epigenetic modification (e.g., through HDAC, sirtuin, and G9a) and transcriptional regulation (primarily through ΔFosB's AP-1 complex) of genes in the nucleus accumbens.

== Transcriptional and epigenetic mechanisms ==
=== Role of HDAC inhibitors in cocaine addiction ===
Histone deacetylase inhibitors (HDAC inhibitors) have been implicated as a potential treatment for cocaine addicts. HDACs are enzymes that can deacetylate the histones associated with genes. This can activate genes for transcription. Several experiments have shown that inhibiting HDACs involved in histone H3K9 deacetylation reduces drug seeking behavior.

It has been known that epigenetic regulations, such as the methylation of H3K9, have a key role in the mechanism of addiction. Recent studies have shown that administering HDAC inhibitors can help reduce the craving for cocaine in rats. Trichostatin A (TsA) is an HDAC inhibitor associated with reduced cocaine-seeking behaviors; it inhibits HDAC classes 1, 3, 4, 6, and 10. Since this HDAC inhibitor has such a significant effect on cocaine-seeking behaviors, scientists have speculated about their ability to reduce a person who is addicted to cocaine's risk of relapse in the rat model system during rehab.

After several tests in which rats were exposed to cocaine followed by either an HDAC inhibitor or a placebo, it was found that HDAC inhibitors had a significant effect on lowering cocaine-seeking behavior. This also suggests an epigenetic mechanism involved in HDAC chromatin regulation. The data is crucial to proving the hypothesis that trichostatin A can remodel chromatin structure and prevent behavioral changes following cocaine exposure. Tests also revealed that HDAC inhibitor administration can not only prevent addiction but also helps reduce the risk of relapse in cocaine addicts in the rat model system.

=== Role of HDAC5 ===
As the previous findings suggest, chronic cocaine use caused both alterations in the chromatin remodeling activity of HDACs and drug-seeking behavior. Renthal et al. focused specifically on the class II histone deacetylase, HDAC5 since it was known to have activity-dependent regulation in neurons. In fact, they found that HDAC5 was a central regulator of the actions of chronic cocaine use and contributed to the behavioral adaptations with its deacetylase activity. Chronic cocaine injections increased HDAC5 phosphorylation at Ser259 in the nucleus accumbens (NAc) within 30 minutes. This provides docking sites for 14-3-3 proteins, which mediate the export of HDAC5 out of the nucleus. They also found that CaMKII was necessary for depolarization-induced HDAC5 phosphorylation in NAc tissue, highlighting its role as a kinase for HDAC5. Experiments with mutant proteins and HDAC inhibitors suggested that HDAC5's action is mediated through its catalytic histone deacetylase domain. Rapid phosphorylation and the export of HDAC5 from the nucleus following cocaine use most likely leads to increased "pulses" of acetylation, targeted gene activation, and behavioral adaptations to long-term cocaine exposure.

The second set of experiments that Renthal et al. performed showed that chronic cocaine use induced upregulation of the NK_{1} receptor protein in HDAC5 knockout mice, which is associated with hyperacetylation of H3 at the NK1R gene promoter. The NK1R gene promoter has been associated with enhanced response to cocaine reward, meaning HDAC5 in normal genomes may decrease cocaine reward with chronic cocaine exposure. They also found key pathways that were implicated in neural plasticity and reward behavior, which included DA receptor signaling, ATF2/CREB signaling, NF-κB, NFAT, cytoskeletal remodeling proteins, and ion channels. Their data implicated chromatin remodeling as a mechanism that drives altered gene activation and behavioral responses to cocaine. With this information, they concluded that within normal (wild-type) genomes, the response to chronic cocaine includes phosphorylation of HDAC5 and export of the deacetylase out of the nucleus to activate downstream target genes. Between exposure and 24 hours after, HDAC5 returns to the cell nucleus to limit the expression of these cocaine-regulated genes by histone deacetylation. Their experiments with HDAC5 knockout mice lent additional support for this hypothesis. Since HDAC5 isn't there to limit the gene's expression, it begins to accumulate with repeated cocaine exposure, with the result being increased sensitivity to cocaine reward.

=== Changes in critical H3K9me3 modifications ===
Modifications to histones such as methylations and acetylations can change gene expression patterns by activating or deactivating a region of DNA for transcription. The H3K9 position has been shown by several studies to be altered by chronic cocaine use.

Addictive behavior observed from long-term cocaine users can be due to changes in the gene expression profiles in the brain's reward circuitry. Most research has been focused on the active regions of the reward-related genes, but Maze et al. focuses at what happens to the heterochromatic regions. Maze et al. showed that heterochromatic regions in the nucleus accumbens (NAc), a major reward circuit in the brain, are significantly altered in the H3K9me3 position. Acute cocaine exposure leads to a rapid increase in H3K9me3 within half an hour and decreases back to normal levels within 24 hours. Chronic cocaine exposure leads to a slower increase in H3K9me3 within an hour (although it reaches the same level as acute by this time) and a 50% decrease from normal baseline levels within 24 hours. This chronic exposure was proposed to decrease heterochromatinization (destabilization) within this brain region in patients given repeated cocaine exposure, which implies that the long-term addictive behaviors are affected by this epigenetic mark. They used ChIP-seq to provide supporting evidence that the H3K9me3 modification is mainly localized to intergenic regions. In these areas of the genome, 17 regions of repeat elements (SINEs, LINEs, LTRs, etc.) had significant H3K9me3 state changes in chronic cocaine exposure mouse models. They used quantitative PCR to determine that of these significant elements, the LINE-1 region showed a significant increase in expression levels. LINE-1 is a retrotransposon, so expressing it inappropriately can activate the transposon to insert itself within important genes and destabilizing the DNA. They conclude their findings by suggesting that LINE-1 retrotransposon insertions cause inappropriate or disrupted expression of genes leading to the addictive behavior.

== Role of G9a in changes to H3K9me2 modification ==
Like Maze et al., studies by Covington et al. focused on histone modification in the nucleus accumbens. They suggest that the H3K9me2 modification in this area of the brain plays a role in the stress and depression pathway. Their idea was that cocaine modifies this epigenetic mark and that this increases an addicted person's vulnerability to stress and depression, which leads to the addictive effects of these reagents. A methyltransferase, G9a, was found to have reduced expression in the nucleus accumbens in cocaine addicts, therefore causing reduced H3K9me2 levels. The genes that are unsilenced via acetylation of the heterochromatin abnormally express the genes involved in BDNF-TrkB-CREB signaling pathway. This causes enhanced phosphorylation of CREB downstream in the pathway. CREB causes enhanced acetylation and dis-regulation of the stress and depression signaling pathways.

Cocaine induces epigenetic changes that lead to neuronal morphology and behavioral changes. Most changes have to do with the disruption of heterochromatin caused by reduced levels of methylation on histones, namely H3K9. This decrease is mediated by the repression of G9a, a histone-lysine N-methyltransferase which is regulated by ΔFosB. ΔFosB is a cocaine-induced transcription factor that accumulates in the nucleus accumbens (NAc) and acts to repress G9a. When ΔFosB is overexpressed, G9a levels are reduced, and H3K9 dimethylation levels are reduced in the NAc. Maze et al. was interested in determining how the reduced levels affects the behavior of cocaine users. Several studies were done in rats and it was concluded that G9a overexpression, and thus the presence of H3K9 dimethylation, caused a decreased preference for cocaine in rats. Researchers then looked at the nuclear volume of rats exposed to cocaine and found that down-regulation of G9a increased the amount of dendritic spines in the nucleus accumbens leading to increased cocaine-seeking behavior.

Only in the nucleus accumbens do G9a levels matter for cocaine addiction. Studies have been done in which G9a levels and H3K9me2 levels were changed in other areas of the brain, but these other locations had no effect on the cocaine-seeking behavior of rats.

=== Gene expression studies in the mesolimbic pathway ===
The role of sirtuin deacetylases have also been shown to play a role in mediating cocaine addiction. To determine their role, the two transcription factors previously mentioned, ΔFosB and CREB, first had to be analyzed. It has been previously stated that ΔFosB increases the cocaine-seeking behavior of users. This is because ΔFosB has a uniquely stable structure that allows it to persist and accumulate in the body. Unlike ΔFosB, CREB is responsible for reducing sensitivity to cocaine which causes negative symptoms during the withdrawal period. Each of these transcription factors increases the cocaine-seeking behavior of addicts. Once this connection between transcription factors had been established, the researchers were curious if other genes caused addictive behaviors too and explored the ones that were significant markers for cocaine addiction, one of which, was the sirtuin gene family. Sirtuins are Class III NAD-dependent histone deacetylases. Not only do sirtuins deacetylate histones, but are also responsible for the deacetylation of tubulin, p53, and NFKB. Several studies have explored the role sirtuins played in cocaine-seeking behavior. In one set of experiments, it was found that a significant increase in ΔFosB in the nucleus accumbens led to ΔFosB binding to the SIRT2 promoter. This increased binding caused acetylation of H3 which is associated with increased Sir2 mRNA. It was also found that the H3 acetylation induced by cocaine increased Sirt1 in the nucleus accumbens. Thus, repeated cocaine use causes an increase in both Sirt1 and Sirt2. Scientists were then interested in determining how increased Sirt1 and Sirt2 affected nuclear volume because it has been previously shown that repeated cocaine use does so. Scientists studying Sirt1 and Sirt2 have also found that these transcription factors led to increased nuclear volume. Therefore, it has been concluded that ΔFosB, CREB, Sirt1, and Sirt2 all play an integral role in cocaine-seeking behaviors.

Kumar et al. focused on how acute and chronic cocaine exposure affected the striatum, which is another area of the brain involved in the reward and locomotor pathways. To study the molecular actions of cocaine in this region, researchers studied the histone modifications of three different promoters: cFos, BDNF, and Cdk5. They saw that cFos, which is normally expressed immediately after neurons fire action potentials, had high levels of H4 acetylation within 30 minutes of a cocaine injection – but no histone modifications were seen with chronic cocaine use. These results suggested that this promoter is activated by acute cocaine use and possibly means that the neurons it regulates fire rapidly during acute cocaine exposure, yet are not affected by long-term use. BDNF has been implicated as a critical regulator in drug dependency, and Cdk5 is implicated in the regulation of cell proliferation genes. Both of these promoters were induced by chronic cocaine use (H3 hyperacetylation). Altering the natural acetylation states of these promoters in acute and chronic cocaine users altered the locomotor and reward responses to cocaine. This suggests that the behavioral activity observed by cocaine users can be attributed, in part, to the histone modifications at these promoter sites.

McClung et al. discuss the gene expression profiles of previously mentioned CREB and ΔFosB as they are involved in cocaine use. These transcription factors have been shown to play a role in the short-term and long-term adaptive changes in the brain. CREB has been implicated in learning, memory, and depression and enriched in cocaine users within the nucleus accumbens. CREB seems to upregulate many genes in its pathway within the reward regions of the brain. It also seems to reduce the rewarding effects of cocaine and leads to depressive-like behaviors instead. The gene expression changes by CREB are induced by short-term cocaine treatment and eventually go back to normal. They also focused on ΔFosB, which is in the family of FosB proteins. While most of these proteins have been implicated in short-term dependence gene expression changes, McClung et al. demonstrated that ΔFosB gene expression changes in the NAc were induced by short-term and long-term cocaine exposure. Short-term cocaine exposure leads to the same expression profiles of upregulated genes as CREB did creating the reduced rewarding effects seen. However, long-term exposure leads to a different expression profile leading to increased rewarding effects. They suggested that ΔFosB acts as a repressor and somehow interacts with the CREB pathway and indirectly leads to the same short-term effects seen, but over time, acts to upregulate genes within its own pathway leading to the increased rewarding effects. It is unknown how these two pathways interact, but they have shown that there is some overlap.

=== Modifications to the gene expression of dopamine receptor pathways ===
Also involved in the CREB-Fos protein pathways is the dopamine D1 receptor (DRD1), expressed in neurons in the nucleus accumbens and caudate putamen regions. Zhang et al. focused on this receptor, as it is known to mediate the effects of cocaine. When stimulated, it increases cAMP levels, in turn leading to CREB activation. They had observed previous cocaine injections led to a direct increase in D1 receptor sensitivity. Through lines of D1 receptor mutant mice, it had also been implicated in mediating both the locomotor sensation and rewarding effects of cocaine. Acute cocaine injections induced c-fos and CREB expression via D1 receptors and repeat cocaine administration, which is associated with long lasting AP-1 transcription complexes containing ΔFosB. Persistent ΔFosB expression in D1 receptors in nucleus accumbens led to a significant increase in the locomotor-stimulating and rewarding effects of cocaine. Conversely, an increase of CREB was shown to decrease the rewarding effects of cocaine. Zhang et al. also used microarrays to identify specific genes induced by chronic cocaine use, which depend on a functional D1 receptor 24 hours after cocaine withdrawal. There were 109 genes identified that were either up or down-regulated by 1.2 fold or more in the caudate putamen D1 receptor mutant mice after repeat injections. The expression of these genes was totally normal in mice with functional D1 receptors, suggesting chronic cocaine use had a direct influence on mediating these genes through a functional DRD1 receptor They found genes belonging to a number of functional groups, and chose six candidate genes from three of these functional groups to verify their differential expression in the caudate putamen. For each gene, researchers verified the dependency of their expression on the D1 receptor after cocaine treatment using Trichostatin A or other receptor antagonists. Specifically, they focused on the genes encoding extracellular factors, receptors, modulators, and intracellular signaling molecules. These can be regulated by chronic cocaine treatment via D1 receptors, and all of the genes contain AP-1 transcriptional complex binding sites in their promoter regions. For extracellular signaling molecules, they looked at the expression of the genes IGFBP6 and SDF1. Both of these were induced in the caudate putamen in wild-type mice but attenuated in the D1 receptor mutants. This suggests that IGFBP6 and SDF1 can be induced by repeat cocaine administration, and also that this interaction is partially dependent on a functional D1 receptor.

=== Direct changes to functional groups ===
Zhang et al. had previously seen that chronic cocaine administration leads to increased dendritic branching and spine density on medium spine neurons and prefrontal cortex pyramidal neurons, which may contribute to cocaine-induced neuroadaptations. When investigating the genes that were receptors and modulators, they found that expression of the sigma 1 receptor and RGS4 was not upregulated after repeat cocaine administration in DA D1 receptor mutants, suggesting functional dopamine D1 receptor is necessary for their induction. This receptor had been seen to modulate the rewarding effects of cocaine, and receptor antagonists had blocked the acute locomotor stimulating effect and lowered behavioral sensitization. Changes in the sigma 1 receptor have been shown to modulate dopamine release, so shifts in its expression can change the behavioral responses to cocaine with pre and post-synaptic influences. They knew that RGS4 proteins can modulate G-protein-coupled receptor function, and since RGS4 levels can increase or decrease in response to D1/D2 receptor stimulation it could be involved in alterations of the signal transduction pathway after D1 receptor activation from repeat cocaine stimulation.

For the genes that encoded intracellular signaling molecules, Zhang et al. focused on the Wrch1 gene. After experimentation researchers found Wrch1 was upregulated by repeat cocaine injections in the caudate putamen in D1 receptor mutants. There was no change in wild-type mice, leading them to believe that Wrch1 may inhibit cocaine-induced and D1 receptor-mediated behavioral changes. A key member of the Wnt signaling pathway, β-catenin, was thought to be induced by chronic cocaine administration (which had been true in the nucleus accumbens) but acute cocaine reduced expression in the caudate putamen whereas chronic cocaine injections decreased expression even in the NAc in D1 receptor mutants. This pathway influences Wrch1, so it can also influence cocaine-induced neuroadaptations. Lastly, they found that CaMKII-α was not upregulated as expected, and CD2 was downregulated in D1 receptor mutants after chronic treatment. These results suggest gene expression changes are definitely induced by chronic cocaine exposure via the D1 receptor and most at AP-1 binding sites.

=== Alterations in the mesocorticolimbic system ===
Contrary to most studies focusing on the nucleus accumbens, Febo et al. suggested that the reward brain circuitry is not the only system involved in addictive behaviors. Previous knowledge has suggested that stimulants induce changes in gene expression in the main parts of mesolimbic circuitry (including the ventral tegmental area, ventral striatum/nucleus accumbens, and prefrontal cortex) and play a big role in development and maintenance of addicted state and chromatin remodeling. They applied this knowledge to investigate whether these gene expression changes are involved in cocaine-related behavioral and molecular adaptations. They found unexpected patterns of brain activation in awake rats that were exposed to sodium butyrate, an HDAC inhibitor (or HDACi). An acute dose resulted in widespread BOLD (blood-oxygen-level dependent) activation in the forebrain and midbrain, but cocaine-induced activation was significantly attenuated after repeat exposure. Sodium butyrate co-treatment with cocaine restored pronounced BOLD activation after successive cocaine treatments. These suggest that the brain's initial response to repeated cocaine exposure triggers a desensitization mechanism which can be overturned by pretreatment with sodium butyrate. The neural circuitry for the epigenetic modifications contributing to cocaine sensitivity was not limited to the mesocorticolimbic dopamine system ("reward system") as they expected. Instead, they saw corticolimbic circuitry (implicated in emotion and memory) had a bigger role in HDACi related alterations of reward behaviors. Evidence that HDACi-mediated enhancement of a stimulant's sensitizing effects is context-specific, and involves associative learning.

== Treatment ==
As of May 2014, there is no effective approved pharmacotherapy for cocaine addiction. HDAC inhibitors have been implicated as a potential treatment for cocaine addiction.

Cognitive behavioral therapy is currently the most effective clinical treatment for psychostimulant addiction in general.
