= Abortive transformation =

The abortive transformation is a transformation of cells, which are unstable. A few generations after transformation the cells revert to normal. This process has been visualized in species such as Saccharomyces cerevisiae, where abortive transformants become formed during homologous recombination.

== See also ==
- Malignant transformation
