= IGFBP1 =

Protein-coding gene in the species Homo sapiens

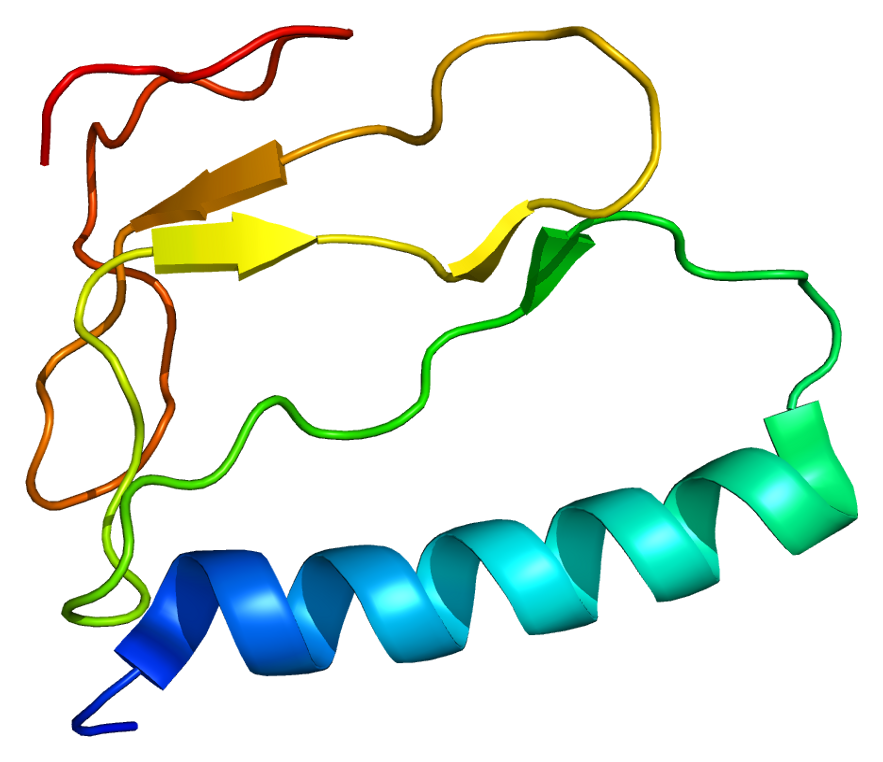

Identifiers
- Aliases: IGFBP1, AFBP, IBP1, IGF-BP25, PP12, hIGFBP-1, insulin like growth factor binding protein 1
- External IDs: OMIM: 146730; MGI: 96436; GeneCards: IGFBP1
Available structures
PDB	Ortholog search: PDBe RCSB
PDB	List of PDB id codes 1ZT3, 1ZT5, 2DSQ

Gene location (Human)
Chr.	Chromosome 7 (human)
Band	7p12.3	Start	45,888,360 bp
Band	7p12.3	End	45,893,660 bp

Gene location (Mouse)
Chr.	Chromosome 11 (mouse)
Band	11 A1|11 4.75 cM	Start	7,147,782 bp
Band	11 A1|11 4.75 cM	End	7,152,546 bp
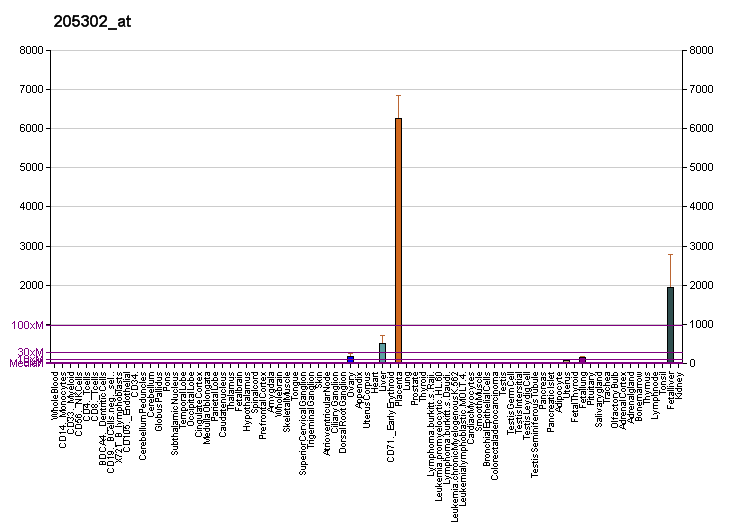
RNA expression pattern
Bgee	Human / Mouse (ortholog); Top expressed in: decidua; right lobe of liver; oocyte; secondary oocyte; gonad; stromal cell of endometrium; testicle; left ovary; right ovary; pericardium / Top expressed in: left lobe of liver; right lobe of liver; human fetus; sexually immature organism; embryo; yolk sac; human kidney; right kidney; cumulus cell; embryo; More reference expression data
BioGPS	More reference expression data
Gene ontology
Molecular function	signaling receptor binding; insulin-like growth factor II binding; insulin-like growth factor binding; growth factor binding; insulin-like growth factor I binding; protein binding
Cellular component	extracellular region; Golgi apparatus; extracellular space; endoplasmic reticulum lumen
Biological process	PERK-mediated unfolded protein response; tissue regeneration; insulin receptor signaling pathway; regulation of cell growth; negative regulation of canonical Wnt signaling pathway; signal transduction; regulation of insulin-like growth factor receptor signaling pathway; positive regulation of cell growth; ageing; post-translational protein modification
Sources:Amigo / QuickGO
Orthologs
Databases	NCBI: entry; OMA: entry
Species	Human	Mouse
Entrez	3484	16006
Ensembl	ENSG00000146678	ENSMUSG00000020429
UniProt	P08833	P47876
RefSeq (mRNA)	NM_001013029; NM_000596	NM_008341
RefSeq (protein)	NP_000587	NP_032367
Location (UCSC)	Chr 7: 45.89 – 45.89 Mb	Chr 11: 7.15 – 7.15 Mb
PubMed search
- Wikidata
View/Edit Human	View/Edit Mouse

Insulin-like growth factor-binding protein 1 (IBP-1) also known as placental protein 12 (PP12) is a protein that in humans is encoded by the IGFBP1 gene.

== Function ==
This gene is a member of the Insulin-like growth factor-binding protein (IGFBP) family and encodes a protein with an IGFBP domain and a type-I thyroglobulin domain. The protein binds both insulin-like growth factors (IGFs) I and II and circulates in the plasma. Binding of this protein prolongs the half-life of the IGFs and alters their interaction with cell surface receptors. Alternate transcriptional splice variants, encoding different isoforms, have been characterized.
