= IGFBP4 =

Protein-coding gene in the species Homo sapiens

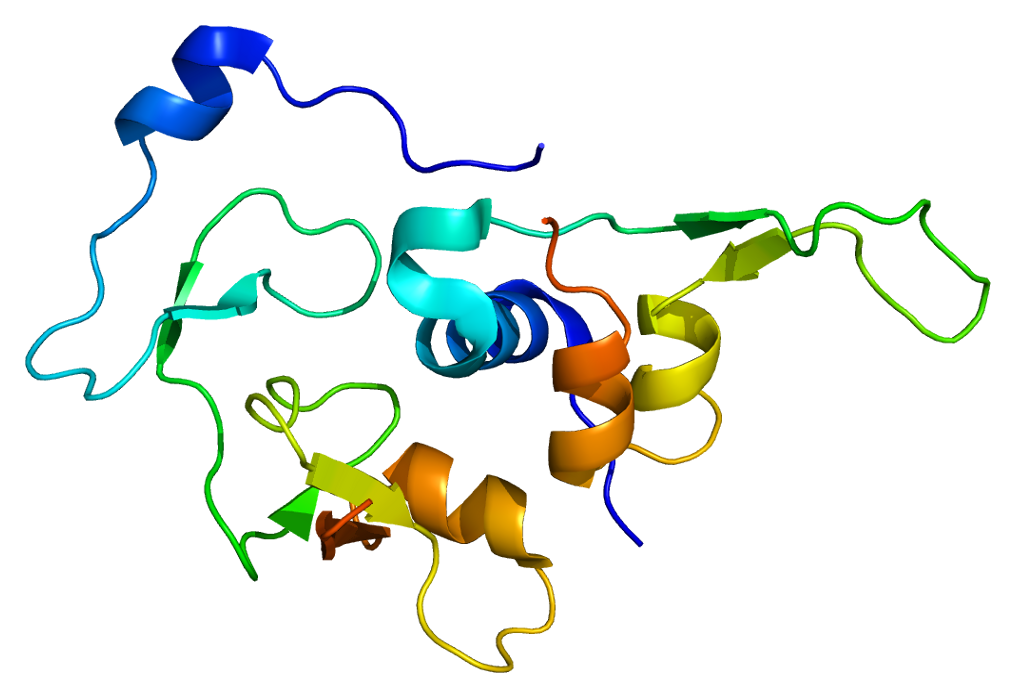

Identifiers
- Aliases: IGFBP4, BP-4, HT29-IGFBP, IBP4, IGFBP-4, insulin like growth factor binding protein 4
- External IDs: OMIM: 146733; MGI: 96439; GeneCards: IGFBP4
Available structures
PDB	Ortholog search: PDBe RCSB
PDB	List of PDB id codes 1WQJ, 2DSP, 2DSQ, 2DSR

Gene location (Human)
Chr.	Chromosome 17 (human)
Band	17q21.2	Start	40,443,450 bp
Band	17q21.2	End	40,457,725 bp

Gene location (Mouse)
Chr.	Chromosome 11 (mouse)
Band	11|11 D	Start	98,932,070 bp
Band	11|11 D	End	98,945,218 bp
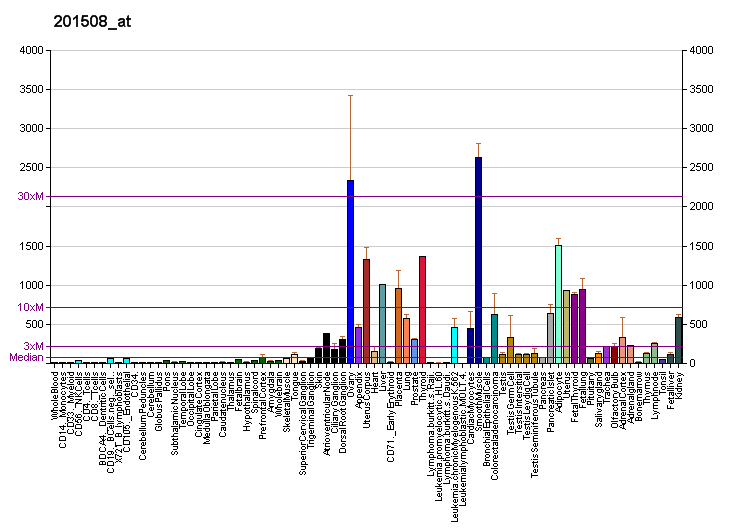
RNA expression pattern
Bgee	Human / Mouse (ortholog); Top expressed in: stromal cell of endometrium; decidua; right ovary; left ovary; left uterine tube; right lobe of liver; right lobe of thyroid gland; canal of the cervix; body of uterus; smooth muscle tissue / Top expressed in: external carotid artery; internal carotid artery; Gonadal ridge; calvaria; aortic valve; ascending aorta; vestibular sensory epithelium; molar; atrium; tunica adventitia of aorta; More reference expression data
BioGPS	More reference expression data
Gene ontology
Molecular function	insulin-like growth factor I binding; insulin-like growth factor II binding; signaling receptor binding; insulin-like growth factor binding; growth factor binding; protein binding
Cellular component	extracellular region; extracellular space; endoplasmic reticulum lumen
Biological process	skeletal system development; regulation of growth; DNA metabolic process; regulation of insulin-like growth factor receptor signaling pathway; regulation of glucose metabolic process; cell population proliferation; inflammatory response; positive regulation of insulin-like growth factor receptor signaling pathway; type B pancreatic cell proliferation; negative regulation of canonical Wnt signaling pathway; regulation of cell growth; signal transduction; positive regulation of MAPK cascade; post-translational protein modification
Sources:Amigo / QuickGO
Orthologs
Databases	NCBI: entry; OMA: entry
Species	Human	Mouse
Entrez	3487	16010
Ensembl	ENSG00000141753	ENSMUSG00000017493
UniProt	P22692	P47879
RefSeq (mRNA)	NM_001552	NM_010517
RefSeq (protein)	NP_001543	NP_034647
Location (UCSC)	Chr 17: 40.44 – 40.46 Mb	Chr 11: 98.93 – 98.95 Mb
PubMed search
- Wikidata
View/Edit Human	View/Edit Mouse

Insulin-like growth factor-binding protein 4 is a protein that in humans is encoded by the IGFBP4 gene.

== Function ==
This gene is a member of the insulin-like growth factor binding protein (IGFBP) family and encodes a protein with an IGFBP domain and a thyroglobulin type-I domain. The protein binds both insulin-like growth factors (IGFs) I and II and circulates in the plasma in both glycosylated and non-glycosylated forms. Binding of this protein prolongs the half-life of the IGFs and alters their interaction with cell surface receptors. IGFBP-4 is a unique protein and it consistently inhibits several cancer cells in vivo and in vitro. Its inhibitory action has been shown in vivo in prostate and colon. It is secreted by all colon cancer cells.

== Clinical significance ==
The protein itself does not prevent the formation of cancer. However it may reduce the growth of cancer and act as an apoptotic factor.

== Interactions ==
IGFBP4 has been shown to interact with Insulin-like growth factor 1 and 2.
