= Mir-301 microRNA precursor family =

mir-301

Identifiers
- Symbol: mir-301
- Rfam: RF02061

Other data
- RNA type: microRNA
- Domain(s): Eukaryota;
- PDB structures: PDBe

In molecular biology mir-301 microRNA is a short RNA molecule. MicroRNAs function to regulate the expression levels of other genes by several mechanisms.
