= Specificity factor =

Amino acid sequence

A specificity factor is an amino acid sequence that mediates target recognition in RNA polymerase. An example is the sigma subunit of the Escherichia coli RNA polymerase holoenzyme which regulates a binding σ subunit of molecular weight 70 kDa. Under some conditions, some of the 70-kDa subunits are replaced by one of the other, more-specific factors. For instance, when bacteria are subjected to heat stress, some of the 70-kDa subunits are replaced by a 32-kDa subunit; when bound to σ32, RNA polymerase is directed to a specialized set of promoters with a different consensus sequence.
