= MicroRNA 148a =

Non-coding RNA in the species Homo sapiens

MIR148A

Identifiers
- Aliases: MIR148A, MIRN148, MIRN148A, hsa-mir-148, mir-148a, microRNA 148a
- External IDs: OMIM: 613786; GeneCards: MIR148A; OMA:MIR148A - orthologs

Gene location (Human)
Chr.	Chromosome 7 (human)
Band	7p15.2	Start	25,949,919 bp
Band	7p15.2	End	25,949,986 bp
RNA expression pattern
Bgee	Human / Mouse (ortholog); Top expressed in: sural nerve; blood; body of pancreas; monocyte; left ventricle; stomach; body of stomach; fundus; endometrium; fallopian tube / n/a; More reference expression data
BioGPS	n/a
Orthologs
Species	Human	Mouse
Entrez	406940	n/a
Ensembl	ENSG00000199085	n/a
UniProt	n a	n/a
RefSeq (mRNA)	n/a	n/a
RefSeq (protein)	n/a	n/a
Location (UCSC)	Chr 7: 25.95 – 25.95 Mb	n/a
PubMed search		n/a
- Wikidata
View/Edit Human

MicroRNA 148a is a miRNA that in humans is encoded by the MIR148A gene.

== Function ==
microRNAs (miRNAs) are short (20-24 nt) non-coding RNAs that are involved in post-transcriptional regulation of gene expression in multicellular organisms by affecting both the stability and translation of mRNAs. miRNAs are transcribed by RNA polymerase II as part of capped and polyadenylated primary transcripts (pri-miRNAs) that can be either protein-coding or non-coding.

The primary transcript is cleaved by the Drosha ribonuclease III enzyme to produce an approximately 70-nt stem-loop precursor miRNA (pre-miRNA), which is further cleaved by the cytoplasmic Dicer ribonuclease to generate the mature miRNA and antisense miRNA star (miRNA*) products.

The mature miRNA is incorporated into a RNA-induced silencing complex (RISC), which recognizes target mRNAs through imperfect base pairing with the miRNA and most commonly results in translational inhibition or destabilization of the target mRNA. The RefSeq represents the predicted microRNA stem-loop.
