= Mir-148/mir-152 microRNA precursor family =

mir-148/mir-152 microRNA precursor family
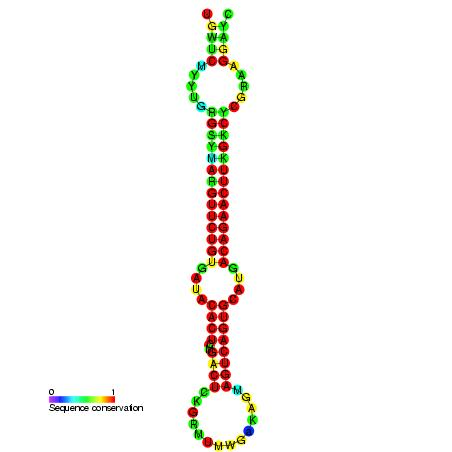
- Predicted secondary structure and sequence conservation of mir-148

Identifiers
- Symbol: mir-148
- Rfam: RF00248
- miRBase: MI0000253
- miRBase family: MIPF0000056

Other data
- RNA type: Gene; miRNA
- Domain: Eukaryota
- GO: GO:0035195 GO:0035068
- SO: SO:0001244
- PDB structures: PDBe

In molecular biology, miR-148 is a microRNA whose expression has been demonstrated in human (MI0000253), mouse (MI0000550), rat (MI0000616) and zebrafish (MI0002015). miR-148 has also been predicted in chicken (MI0001189).

These predicted hairpin precursor sequence are related to those of miR-152, which has been expressed in mouse (MI0000174) and is predicted in human (MI0000462).

The hairpin precursors (represented here) are predicted based on base pairing and cross-species conservation; their extents are not known. In this case, the mature sequence is excised from the 3' arm of the hairpin.

== Targets of miR-148 ==
MicroRNAs act by lowering the expression of genes by binding to target sites in the 3' UTR of the mRNAs. However recently it was shown by Duursma and colleagues that miR-148 down regulates Dnmt3b by binding to a region in the protein coding region.
