= Promoter (genetics) =

Region of DNA encouraging transcription

1: RNA Polymerase 2: Repressor 3: Promoter 4: Operator 5: Lactose 6: lacZ, 7: lacY, 8: lacA. Top: The transcription of the gene is turned off. There is no lactose to inhibit the repressor, so the repressor binds to the operator, which obstructs the RNA polymerase from binding to the promoter and making the mRNA encoding the lactase gene. Bottom: The gene is turned on. Lactose is inhibiting the repressor, allowing the RNA polymerase to bind with the promoter and express the genes, which synthesize lactase. Eventually, the lactase will digest all of the lactose, until there is none to bind to the repressor. The repressor will then bind to the operator, stopping the manufacture of lactase.

In genetics, a promoter is a sequence of DNA to which proteins bind to initiate transcription of a single RNA transcript from the DNA downstream of the promoter. The RNA transcript may encode a protein (mRNA), or can have a function in and of itself, such as tRNA or rRNA. Promoters are located near the transcription start sites of genes, upstream on the DNA (towards the 5' region of the sense strand). Promoters can be about 100–1000 base pairs long, the sequence of which is highly dependent on the gene and product of transcription, type or class of RNA polymerase recruited to the site, and species of organism.

== Overview ==
For transcription to take place, the enzyme that synthesizes RNA, known as RNA polymerase, must attach to the DNA near a gene. Promoters contain specific DNA sequences such as response elements that provide a secure initial binding site for RNA polymerase and for proteins called transcription factors that recruit RNA polymerase. These transcription factors have specific activator or repressor sequences of corresponding nucleotides that attach to specific promoters and regulate gene expression.

In bacteria
The promoter is recognized by RNA polymerase and an associated sigma factor, which in turn are often brought to the promoter DNA by an activator protein's binding to its own DNA binding site nearby.
In eukaryotes
The process is more complicated, and at least seven different factors are necessary for the binding of an RNA polymerase II to the promoter.
In archaea
The promoter resembles a eukaryotic one, though much more simplified. It contains BRE and TATA elements and are recognized by TFB and TBP.

Promoters represent critical elements that can work in concert with other regulatory regions (enhancers, silencers, boundary elements/insulators) to direct the level of transcription of a given gene. A promoter is induced in response to changes in abundance or conformation of regulatory proteins in a cell, which enable activating transcription factors to recruit RNA polymerase.

Given the short sequences of most promoter elements, promoters can rapidly evolve from random sequences. For instance, in E. coli, ~60% of random sequences can evolve expression levels comparable to the wild-type lac promoter with only one mutation, and that ~10% of random sequences can serve as active promoters even without evolution.

== Identification of relative location ==
As promoters are typically immediately adjacent to the gene in question, positions in the promoter are designated relative to the transcriptional start site, where transcription of DNA begins for a particular gene (i.e., positions upstream are negative numbers counting back from -1, for example -100 is a position 100 base pairs upstream).

== Elements ==
=== Bacterial ===
In bacteria, the promoter contains two short sequence elements approximately 10 (Pribnow Box) and 35 nucleotides upstream from the transcription start site.

- The sequence at -10 (the -10 element) has the consensus sequence TATAAT.
- The sequence at -35 (the -35 element) has the consensus sequence TTGACA.
- The above consensus sequences, while conserved on average, are not found intact in most promoters. On average, only 3 to 4 of the 6 base pairs in each consensus sequence are found in any given promoter. Few natural promoters have been identified to date that possess intact consensus sequences at both the -10 and -35; artificial promoters with complete conservation of the -10 and -35 elements have been found to transcribe at lower frequencies than those with a few mismatches with the consensus.
- The optimal spacing between the -35 and -10 sequences is 17 bp. The spacer sequence affects promoter strength by up to 600-fold.
- Some promoters contain one or more upstream promoter element (UP element) subsites (consensus sequence 5'-AAAAAARNR-3' when centered in the -42 region; consensus sequence 5'-AWWWWWTTTTT-3' when centered in the -52 region; W = A or T; R = A or G; N = any base).
- The transcription start site has the consensus sequence YRY.

The above promoter sequences are recognized only by RNA polymerase holoenzyme containing sigma-70. RNA polymerase holoenzymes containing other sigma factors recognize different core promoter sequences.

← upstream                                                                     downstream →
5'-XXXXXXXPPPPPPXXXXXXPPPPPPXXXXGGGGGGGGGGGGGGGGGGGGGGGGGGGGGGGGGGGGGGGGGGGGGGGGGGGGGXXXX-3'
           -35       -10       Gene to be transcribed

==== Probability of occurrence of each nucleotide ====
 for -10 sequence
 T    A    T    A    A   T
77%  76%  60%  61%  56%  82%

 for -35 sequence
 T    T    G    A    C    A
69%  79%  61%  56%  54%  54%

==== Bidirectional (prokaryotic) ====
Promoters can be very closely located in the DNA. Such "closely spaced promoters" have been observed in the DNAs of all life forms, from humans to prokaryotes and are highly conserved. Therefore, they may provide some (presently unknown) advantages. These pairs of promoters can be positioned in divergent, tandem, and convergent directions. They can also be regulated by transcription factors and differ in various features, such as the nucleotide distance between them, the two promoter strengths, etc. The most important aspect of two closely spaced promoters is that they will, most likely, interfere with each other. Several studies have explored this using both analytical and stochastic models. There are also studies that measured gene expression in synthetic genes or from one to a few genes controlled by bidirectional promoters.

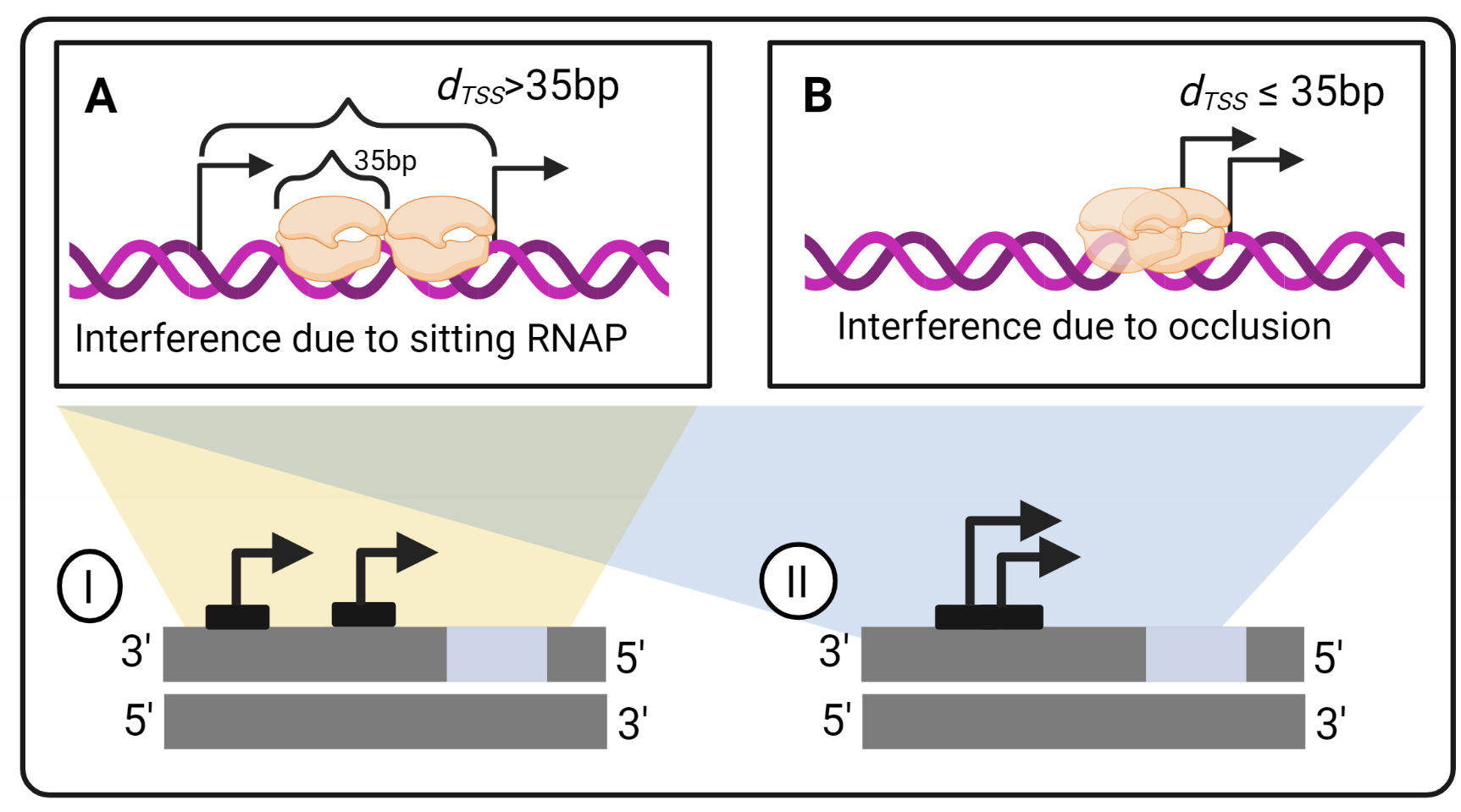
Depiction the phenomenon of interference between tandem promoters.

More recently, one study measured most genes controlled by tandem promoters in E. coli. In that study, two main forms of interference were measured. One is when an RNAP is on the downstream promoter, blocking the movement of RNAPs elongating from the upstream promoter. The other is when the two promoters are so close that when an RNAP sits on one of the promoters, it blocks any other RNAP from reaching the other promoter. These events are possible because the RNAP occupies several nucleotides when bound to the DNA, including in transcription start sites.

Similar events occur when the promoters are in divergent and convergent formations. The possible events also depend on the distance between them.

=== Eukaryotic ===
Gene promoters are typically located upstream of the gene and can have regulatory elements several kilobases away from the transcriptional start site (enhancers). In eukaryotes, the transcriptional complex can cause the DNA to bend back on itself, which allows for placement of regulatory sequences far from the actual site of transcription. Eukaryotic RNA-polymerase-II-dependent promoters can contain a TATA box (consensus sequence TATAAA), which is recognized by the general transcription factor TATA-binding protein (TBP); and a B recognition element (BRE), which is recognized by the general transcription factor TFIIB. The TATA element and BRE typically are located close to the transcriptional start site (typically within 30 to 40 base pairs).

Eukaryotic promoter regulatory sequences typically bind proteins called transcription factors that are involved in the formation of the transcriptional complex. An example is the E-box (sequence CACGTG), which binds transcription factors in the basic helix-loop-helix (bHLH) family (e.g. BMAL1-Clock, cMyc). Some promoters that are targeted by multiple transcription factors might achieve a hyperactive state, leading to increased transcriptional activity.

- Core promoter – the minimal portion of the promoter required to properly initiate transcription
  - Includes the transcription start site (TSS) and elements directly upstream
  - A binding site for RNA polymerase
    - RNA polymerase I: transcribes genes encoding 18S, 5.8S and 28S ribosomal RNAs
    - RNA polymerase II: transcribes genes encoding messenger RNA and certain small nuclear RNAs and microRNA
    - RNA polymerase III: transcribes genes encoding transfer RNA, 5s ribosomal RNAs and other small RNAs
  - General transcription factor binding sites, e.g. TATA box, B recognition element.
  - Many other elements/motifs may be present. There is no such thing as a set of "universal elements" found in every core promoter.
- Proximal promoter – the proximal sequence upstream of the gene that tends to contain primary regulatory elements
  - Approximately 250 base pairs upstream of the start site
  - Specific transcription factor binding sites
- Distal promoter – the distal sequence upstream of the gene that may contain additional regulatory elements, often with a weaker influence than the proximal promoter
  - Anything further upstream (but not an enhancer or other regulatory region whose influence is positional/orientation independent)
  - Specific transcription factor binding sites

==== Mammalian promoters ====
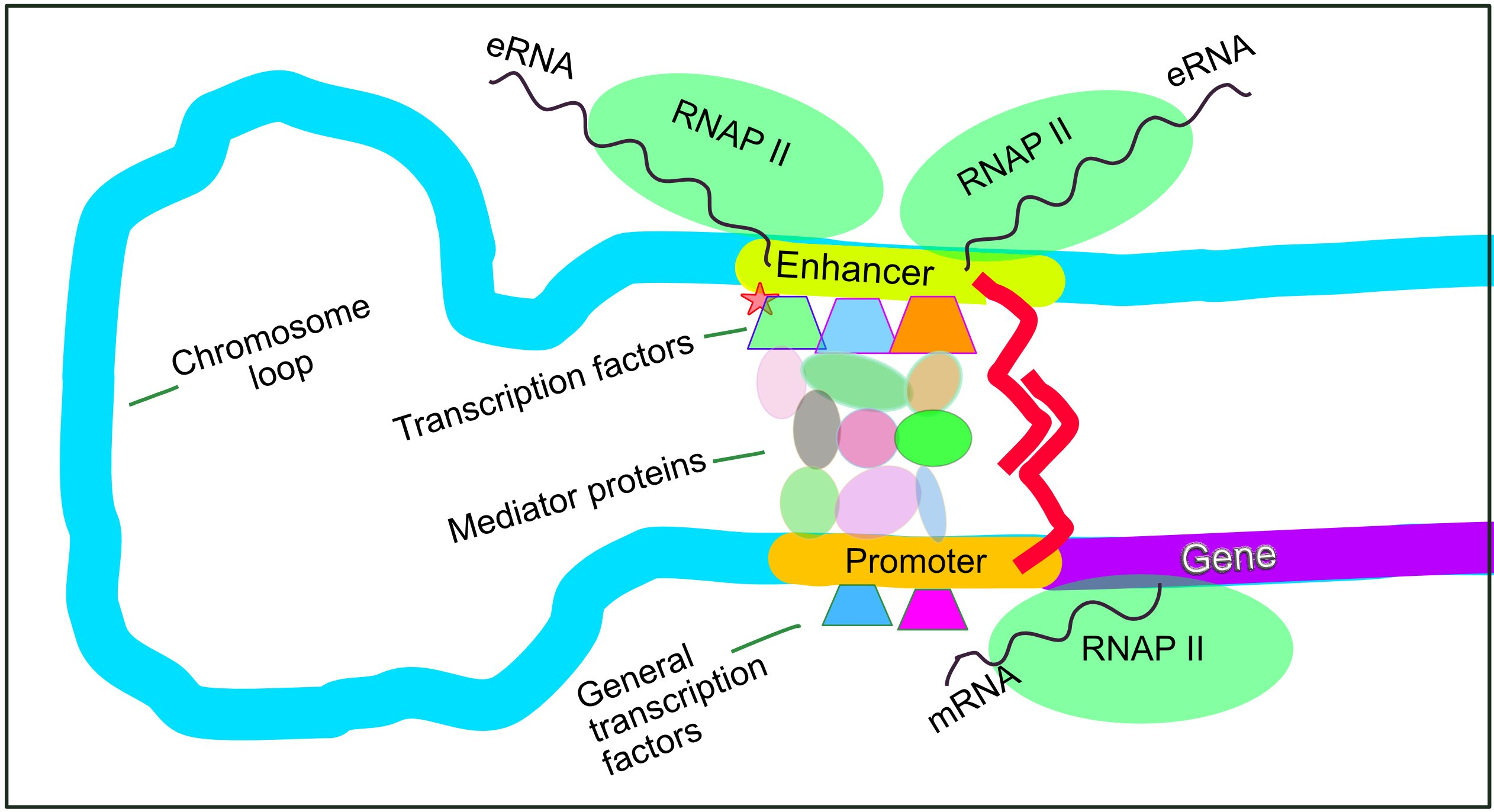
Regulation of transcription in mammals. An active enhancer regulatory region is enabled to interact with the promoter region of its target gene by formation of a chromosome loop. This can initiate messenger RNA (mRNA) synthesis by RNA polymerase II (RNAP II) bound to the promoter at the transcription start site of the gene. The loop is stabilized by one architectural protein anchored to the enhancer and one anchored to the promoter and these proteins are joined to form a dimer (red zigzags). Specific regulatory transcription factors bind to DNA sequence motifs on the enhancer. General transcription factors bind to the promoter. When a transcription factor is activated by a signal (here indicated as phosphorylation shown by a small red star on a transcription factor on the enhancer) the enhancer is activated and can now activate its target promoter. The active enhancer is transcribed on each strand of DNA in opposite directions by bound RNAP IIs. Mediator (coactivator) (a complex consisting of about 26 proteins in an interacting structure) communicates regulatory signals from the enhancer DNA-bound transcription factors to the promoter.

Up-regulated expression of genes in mammals is initiated when signals are transmitted to the promoters associated with the genes. Promoter DNA sequences may include different elements such as CpG islands (present in about 70% of promoters), a TATA box (present in about 24% of promoters), initiator (Inr) (present in about 49% of promoters), upstream and downstream TFIIB recognition elements (BREu and BREd) (present in about 22% of promoters), and downstream core promoter element (DPE) (present in about 12% of promoters). The presence of multiple methylated CpG sites in CpG islands of promoters causes stable silencing of genes. However, the presence or absence of the other elements have relatively small effects on gene expression in experiments. Two sequences, the TATA box and Inr, caused small but significant increases in expression (45% and 28% increases, respectively). The BREu and the BREd elements significantly decreased expression by 35% and 20%, respectively, and the DPE element had no detected effect on expression.

Cis-regulatory modules that are localized in DNA regions distant from the promoters of genes can have very large effects on gene expression, with some genes undergoing up to 100-fold increased expression due to such a cis-regulatory module. These cis-regulatory modules include enhancers, silencers, insulators and tethering elements. Among this constellation of elements, enhancers and their associated transcription factors have a leading role in the regulation of gene expression.

===== Enhancers =====
Enhancers are regions of the genome that are major gene-regulatory elements. Enhancers control cell-type-specific gene expression programs, most often by looping through long distances to come in physical proximity with the promoters of their target genes. In a study of brain cortical neurons, 24,937 loops were found, bringing enhancers to promoters. Multiple enhancers, each often at tens or hundred of thousands of nucleotides distant from their target genes, loop to their target gene promoters and coordinate with each other to control expression of their common target gene.

The schematic illustration in this section shows an enhancer looping around to come into close physical proximity with the promoter of a target gene. The loop is stabilized by a dimer of a connector protein (e.g. dimer of CTCF or YY1), with one member of the dimer anchored to its binding motif on the enhancer and the other member anchored to its binding motif on the promoter (represented by the red zigzags in the illustration). Several cell function specific transcription factors (there are about 1,600 transcription factors in a human cell) generally bind to specific motifs on an enhancer and a small combination of these enhancer-bound transcription factors, when brought close to a promoter by a DNA loop, govern the level of transcription of the target gene. Mediator (coactivator) (a complex usually consisting of about 26 proteins in an interacting structure) communicates regulatory signals from enhancer DNA-bound transcription factors directly to the RNA polymerase II (pol II) enzyme bound to the promoter.

Enhancers, when active, are generally transcribed from both strands of DNA with RNA polymerases acting in two different directions, producing two eRNAs as illustrated in the Figure. An inactive enhancer may be bound by an inactive transcription factor. Phosphorylation of the transcription factor may activate it and that activated transcription factor may then activate the enhancer to which it is bound (see small red star representing phosphorylation of transcription factor bound to enhancer in the illustration). An activated enhancer begins transcription of its RNA before activating a promoter to initiate transcription of messenger RNA from its target gene.

===== Alternative promoters =====
Many mammalian genes can have more than one promoter, each able to drive expression of a different transcript isoform with the same coding sequence but different UTR, or even different coding sequences. An analysis of RNA-seq data from 18,468 cancer and normal samples found that alternative promoters contribute substantially to context-specific transcription, and that for genes with independently regulated promoters, promoter activity predicted patient survival more accurately than overall gene expression. Alternative first exons can also change where a protein acts: in the mouse, an oocyte-specific first exon of the Dnmt1 gene produces an N-terminally truncated DNMT1 protein that is held in the cytoplasm during late oocyte growth. Beyond correlation, CRISPR interference was used to silence specific promoters, showing that in a proportion of genes the different promoters caused distinct effects on gene expression and drug response.

==== Bidirectional (mammalian) ====
Bidirectional promoters are short (<1 kbp) intergenic regions of DNA between the 5' ends of the genes in a bidirectional gene pair. A "bidirectional gene pair" refers to two adjacent genes coded on opposite strands, with their 5' ends oriented toward one another. The two genes are often functionally related, and modification of their shared promoter region allows them to be co-regulated and thus co-expressed. Bidirectional promoters are a common feature of mammalian genomes. About 11% of human genes are bidirectionally paired.

Bidirectionally paired genes in the Gene Ontology database shared at least one database-assigned functional category with their partners 47% of the time. Microarray analysis has shown bidirectionally paired genes to be co-expressed to a higher degree than random genes or neighboring unidirectional genes. Although co-expression does not necessarily indicate co-regulation, methylation of bidirectional promoter regions has been shown to downregulate both genes, and demethylation to upregulate both genes. There are exceptions to this, however. In some cases (about 11%), only one gene of a bidirectional pair is expressed. In these cases, the promoter is implicated in suppression of the non-expressed gene. The mechanism behind this could be competition for the same polymerases, or chromatin modification. Divergent transcription could shift nucleosomes to upregulate transcription of one gene, or remove bound transcription factors to downregulate transcription of one gene.

Some functional classes of genes are more likely to be bidirectionally paired than others. Genes implicated in DNA repair are five times more likely to be regulated by bidirectional promoters than by unidirectional promoters. Chaperone proteins are three times more likely, and mitochondrial genes are more than twice as likely. Many basic housekeeping and cellular metabolic genes are regulated by bidirectional promoters.

The overrepresentation of bidirectionally paired DNA repair genes associates these promoters with cancer. Forty-five percent of human somatic oncogenes seem to be regulated by bidirectional promoters – significantly more than non-cancer causing genes. Hypermethylation of the promoters between gene pairs WNT9A/CD558500, CTDSPL/BC040563, and KCNK15/BF195580 has been associated with tumors.

Certain sequence characteristics have been observed in bidirectional promoters, including a lack of TATA boxes, an abundance of CpG islands, and a symmetry around the midpoint of dominant Cs and As on one side and Gs and Ts on the other. A motif with the consensus sequence of TCTCGCGAGA, also called the CGCG element, was recently shown to drive PolII-driven bidirectional transcription in CpG islands. CCAAT boxes are common, as they are in many promoters that lack TATA boxes. In addition, the motifs NRF-1, GABPA, YY1, and ACTACAnnTCCC are represented in bidirectional promoters at significantly higher rates than in unidirectional promoters. The absence of TATA boxes in bidirectional promoters suggests that TATA boxes play a role in determining the directionality of promoters, but counterexamples of bidirectional promoters do possess TATA boxes and unidirectional promoters without them indicates that they cannot be the only factor.

Although the term "bidirectional promoter" refers specifically to promoter regions of mRNA-encoding genes, luciferase assays have shown that over half of human genes do not have a strong directional bias. Research suggests that non-coding RNAs are frequently associated with the promoter regions of mRNA-encoding genes. It has been hypothesized that the recruitment and initiation of RNA polymerase II usually begins bidirectionally, but divergent transcription is halted at a checkpoint later during elongation. Possible mechanisms behind this regulation include sequences in the promoter region, chromatin modification, and the spatial orientation of the DNA.

=== Archaea ===
The archaeal promoter resembles a eukaryotic one: a TATA box (at -26/-27) and an upstream BRE (at -33/-34) are commonly found, binding to TBP and TFB (homolog of TFIIB). There are also occasionally an initiator element (INR) near the transcription start site [TSS], and a promoter proximal element (PPE) between BRE-TATA and TSS. These two are not necessary, but enhance the strength of a promoter. TFE (homolog of TFIIE) promotes initiation at suboptimal promoter sequences. It binds between -10 and +1, near the Inr.

Strict conservation of these motifs are not necessary, and many archaea with high GC% show "degenerated" TATA boxes. Rather, it's the energetic (duplex enthalpy, duplex stability) and structural (intrinsic curvature, bendability) features of the promoter that mainly matter.

== Subgenomic ==
A subgenomic promoter is a promoter added to a virus for a specific heterologous gene, resulting in the formation of mRNA for that gene alone. Many positive-sense RNA viruses produce these subgenomic mRNAs (sgRNA) as one of the common infection techniques used by these viruses and generally transcribe late viral genes. Subgenomic promoters range from 24 nucleotide (Sindbis virus) to over 100 nucleotides (Beet necrotic yellow vein virus) and are usually found upstream of the transcription start.

== Detection ==
A wide variety of algorithms have been developed to facilitate detection of promoters in genomic sequence, and promoter prediction is a common element of many gene prediction methods. Many such tools have been developed. A bacterial promoter region is located before the -35 and -10 Consensus sequences. The closer the promoter region is to the consensus sequences the more often transcription of that gene will take place. There is not a set pattern for promoter regions as there are for consensus sequences.

One approach is to use a biophysical theory of why promoters work. For archaea, a combination of calculated energetic and structural features can detect promoters. For bacteria, a biophysical model that estimates RNAP-sigma70 binding probability can detect and estimate the strengths of promoters.

Another approach is to use a pattern-matching program based on known promoters, from simple hand-crafted regular expressions to advanced machine learning methods such as decision trees, hidden Markov models (HMM), and neural networks. YAPP, an 2000s eukaryotic core-promoter prediction program, uses HMM. A 2017 publication predicts bacterial and eukaryotic promoters using a convolutional neural network.

== Binding ==
The initiation of the transcription is a multistep sequential process that involves several mechanisms: promoter location, initial reversible binding of RNA polymerase, conformational changes in RNA polymerase, conformational changes in DNA, binding of nucleoside triphosphate (NTP) to the functional RNA polymerase-promoter complex, and nonproductive and productive initiation of RNA synthesis.

The promoter binding process is crucial in the understanding of the process of gene expression. Tuning synthetic genetic systems relies on precisely engineered synthetic promoters with known levels of transcription rates.

=== Location ===
Although RNA polymerase holoenzyme shows high affinity to non-specific sites of the DNA, this characteristic does not allow us to clarify the process of promoter location. This process of promoter location has been attributed to the structure of the holoenzyme to DNA and sigma 4 to DNA complexes.

== Diseases associated with aberrant function ==
Most diseases are heterogeneous in cause, meaning that one "disease" is often many different diseases at the molecular level, though symptoms exhibited and response to treatment may be identical. How diseases of different molecular origin respond to treatments is partially addressed in the discipline of pharmacogenomics.

Not listed here are the many kinds of cancers involving aberrant transcriptional regulation owing to creation of chimeric genes through pathological chromosomal translocation. Importantly, intervention in the number or structure of promoter-bound proteins is one key to treating a disease without affecting expression of unrelated genes sharing elements with the target gene. Some genes whose change is not desirable are capable of influencing the potential of a cell to become cancerous.

== CpG islands in promoters ==
In humans, about 70% of promoters located near the transcription start site of a gene (proximal promoters) contain a CpG island. CpG islands are generally 200 to 2000 base pairs long, have a C:G base pair content >50%, and have regions of DNA where a cytosine nucleotide is followed by a guanine nucleotide and this occurs frequently in the linear sequence of bases along its 5' → 3' direction.

Distal promoters also frequently contain CpG islands, such as the promoter of the DNA repair gene ERCC1, where the CpG island-containing promoter is located about 5,400 nucleotides upstream of the coding region of the ERCC1 gene. CpG islands also occur frequently in promoters for functional noncoding RNAs such as microRNAs.

=== Methylation of CpG islands stably silences genes ===
In humans, DNA methylation occurs at the 5' position of the pyrimidine ring of the cytosine residues within CpG sites to form 5-methylcytosines. The presence of multiple methylated CpG sites in CpG islands of promoters causes stable silencing of genes. Silencing of a gene may be initiated by other mechanisms, but this is often followed by methylation of CpG sites in the promoter CpG island to cause the stable silencing of the gene.

=== Promoter CpG hyper/hypo-methylation in cancer ===
Generally, in progression to cancer, hundreds of genes are silenced or activated. Although silencing of some genes in cancers occurs by mutation, a large proportion of carcinogenic gene silencing is a result of altered DNA methylation (see DNA methylation in cancer). DNA methylation causing silencing in cancer typically occurs at multiple CpG sites in the CpG islands that are present in the promoters of protein coding genes.

Altered expressions of microRNAs also silence or activate many genes in progression to cancer (see microRNAs in cancer). Altered microRNA expression occurs through hyper/hypo-methylation of CpG sites in CpG islands in promoters controlling transcription of the microRNAs.

Silencing of DNA repair genes through methylation of CpG islands in their promoters appears to be especially important in progression to cancer (see methylation of DNA repair genes in cancer).

== Canonical sequences and wild-type ==
The usage of the term canonical sequence to refer to a promoter is often problematic, and can lead to misunderstandings about promoter sequences. Canonical implies perfect, in some sense.

In the case of a transcription factor binding site, there may be a single sequence that binds the protein most strongly under specified cellular conditions. This might be called canonical.

However, natural selection may favor less energetic binding as a way of regulating transcriptional output. In this case, we may call the most common sequence in a population the wild-type sequence. It may not even be the most advantageous sequence to have under prevailing conditions.

Recent evidence also indicates that several genes (including the proto-oncogene c-myc) have G-quadruplex motifs as potential regulatory signals.

== Diseases that may be associated with variations ==
Some cases of many genetic diseases are associated with variations in promoters or transcription factors.

Examples include:

- Asthma
- Beta thalassemia
- Rubinstein-Taybi syndrome

== Constitutive vs regulated ==
Some promoters are called constitutive as they are active in all circumstances in the cell, while others are regulated, becoming active in the cell only in response to specific stimuli.

== Tissue-specific promoter ==
A tissue-specific promoter is a promoter that has activity in only certain cell types.

== Use of the term ==
When referring to a promoter some authors actually mean promoter + operator; i.e., the lac promoter is IPTG inducible, meaning that besides the lac promoter, the lac operon is also present. If the lac operator were not present the IPTG would not have an inducible effect. Another example is the Tac-Promoter system (Ptac). Notice how tac is written as a tac promoter, while in fact tac is actually both a promoter and an operator.

== See also ==
- Activator (genetics)
- Enhancer (genetics)
- Glossary of gene expression terms
- Operon
- Regulation of gene expression
- Repressor
- Transcription factor
- Promoter bashing
