= IGFBP5 =

Protein-coding gene in the species Homo sapiens

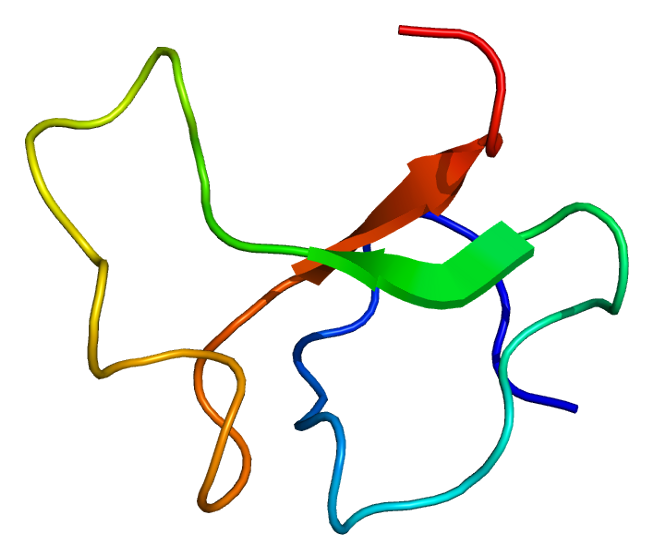

Identifiers
- Aliases: IGFBP5, IBP5, insulin like growth factor binding protein 5
- External IDs: OMIM: 146734; MGI: 96440; GeneCards: IGFBP5
Available structures
PDB	Ortholog search: PDBe RCSB
PDB	List of PDB id codes 1BOE, 1H59

Gene location (Human)
Chr.	Chromosome 2 (human)
Band	2q35	Start	216,672,105 bp
Band	2q35	End	216,695,549 bp

Gene location (Mouse)
Chr.	Chromosome 1 (mouse)
Band	1 C3|1 36.94 cM	Start	72,897,091 bp
Band	1 C3|1 36.94 cM	End	72,914,043 bp
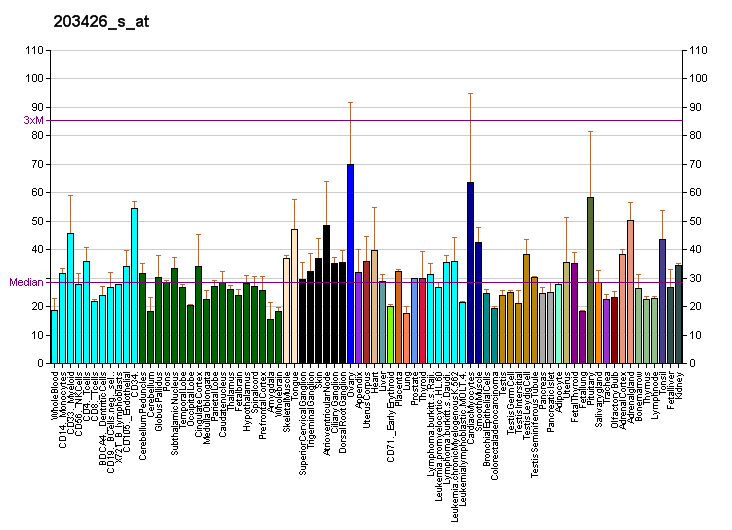

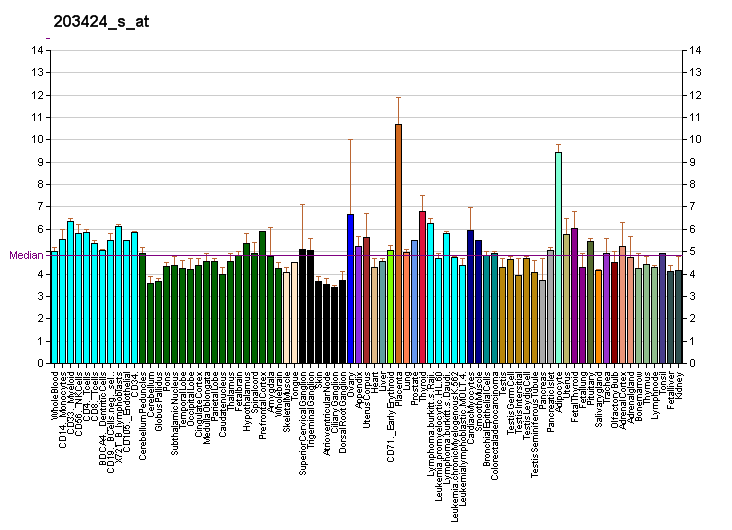

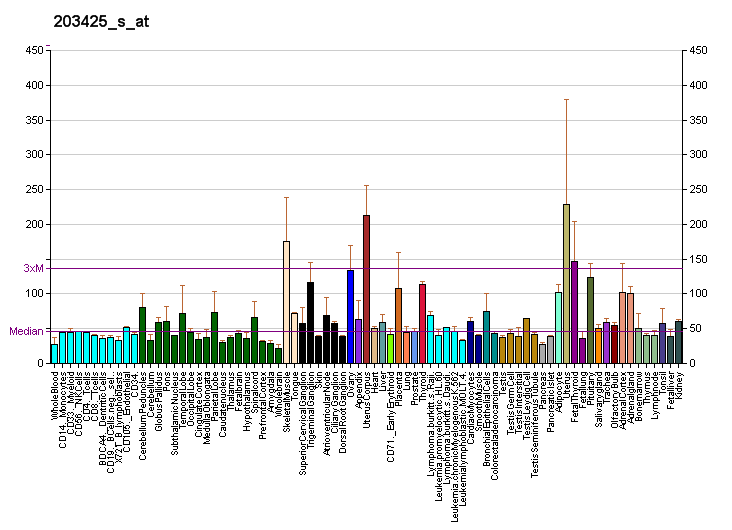
RNA expression pattern
Bgee	Human / Mouse (ortholog); Top expressed in: renal medulla; urethra; saphenous vein; nipple; vena cava; cardia; pylorus; canal of the cervix; left uterine tube; right ovary / Top expressed in: ciliary body; external carotid artery; molar; lactiferous gland; saccule; extraocular muscle; ankle; otic placode; otic vesicle; internal carotid artery; More reference expression data
BioGPS	More reference expression data
Gene ontology
Molecular function	fibronectin binding; insulin-like growth factor binding; growth factor binding; insulin-like growth factor I binding; insulin-like growth factor II binding; protein binding
Cellular component	insulin-like growth factor ternary complex; extracellular region; insulin-like growth factor binding protein complex; endoplasmic reticulum lumen; extracellular space
Biological process	negative regulation of smooth muscle cell proliferation; negative regulation of translation; positive regulation of protein kinase B signaling; intracellular signal transduction; negative regulation of growth; glucose homeostasis; female pregnancy; cellular response to organic cyclic compound; negative regulation of smooth muscle cell migration; negative regulation of osteoblast differentiation; regulation of glucose metabolic process; negative regulation of cell migration; positive regulation of insulin-like growth factor receptor signaling pathway; regulation of cell growth; osteoblast differentiation; response to growth hormone; glucose metabolic process; negative regulation of insulin-like growth factor receptor signaling pathway; hair follicle morphogenesis; regulation of growth; negative regulation of muscle tissue development; striated muscle cell differentiation; lung alveolus development; negative regulation of skeletal muscle hypertrophy; type B pancreatic cell proliferation; cellular response to cAMP; signal transduction; mammary gland involution; ageing; post-translational protein modification; positive regulation of vascular associated smooth muscle cell proliferation; positive regulation of vascular associated smooth muscle cell migration; regulation of insulin-like growth factor receptor signaling pathway
Sources:Amigo / QuickGO
Orthologs
Databases	NCBI: entry; OMA: entry
Species	Human	Mouse
Entrez	3488	16011
Ensembl	ENSG00000115461	ENSMUSG00000026185
UniProt	P24593	Q07079
RefSeq (mRNA)	NM_000599	NM_010518
RefSeq (protein)	NP_000590	NP_034648
Location (UCSC)	Chr 2: 216.67 – 216.7 Mb	Chr 1: 72.9 – 72.91 Mb
PubMed search
- Wikidata
View/Edit Human	View/Edit Mouse

Insulin-like growth factor-binding protein 5 (IBF-5) is a protein that in humans is encoded by the IGFBP5 gene. An IGFBP5 gene was recently identified as being important for adaptation to varying water salinity in fish.
