= IGFBP6 =

Protein-coding gene in the species Homo sapiens

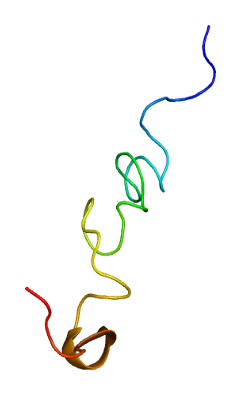

Identifiers
- Aliases: IGFBP6, IBP6, insulin like growth factor binding protein 6
- External IDs: OMIM: 146735; MGI: 96441; GeneCards: IGFBP6
Available structures
PDB	Ortholog search: PDBe RCSB
PDB	List of PDB id codes 1RMJ

Gene location (Mouse)
Chr.	Chromosome 15 (mouse)
Band	15|15 F2	Start	102,052,797 bp
Band	15|15 F2	End	102,057,946 bp
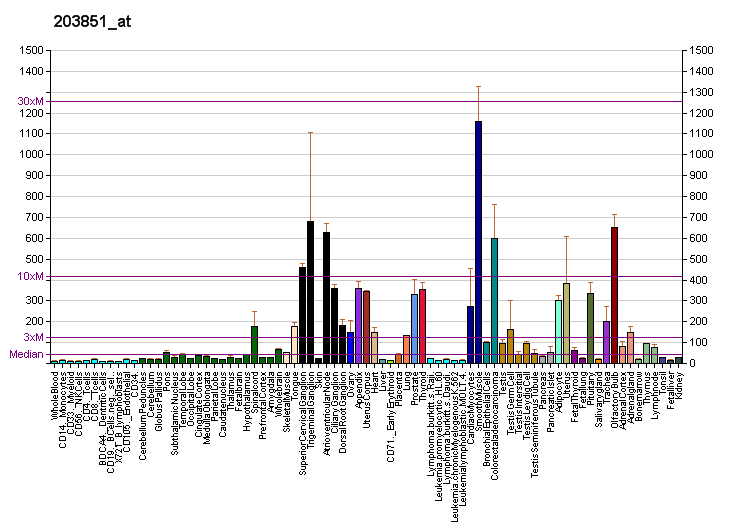
RNA expression pattern
Bgee	Human / Mouse (ortholog); Top expressed in: Achilles tendon; tibial nerve; gastric mucosa; canal of the cervix; left uterine tube; right coronary artery; thoracic aorta; ascending aorta; trigeminal ganglion; left coronary artery / Top expressed in: ankle; uterus; right lung; right lung lobe; ankle joint; cervix; left lung; lip; white adipose tissue; esophagus; More reference expression data
BioGPS	More reference expression data
Gene ontology
Molecular function	insulin-like growth factor binding; signaling receptor binding; growth factor binding; insulin-like growth factor I binding; insulin-like growth factor II binding; fibronectin binding
Cellular component	cytoplasm; Golgi apparatus; extracellular region; extracellular space; insulin-like growth factor binary complex
Biological process	regulation of insulin-like growth factor receptor signaling pathway; negative regulation of canonical Wnt signaling pathway; regulation of cell growth; signal transduction; negative regulation of cell population proliferation
Sources:Amigo / QuickGO
Orthologs
Databases	NCBI: entry
Species	Human	Mouse
Entrez	3489	16012
Ensembl	n/a	ENSMUSG00000023046
UniProt	P24592	P47880
RefSeq (mRNA)	NM_002178	NM_008344
RefSeq (protein)	NP_002169	NP_032370
Location (UCSC)	n/a	Chr 15: 102.05 – 102.06 Mb
PubMed search
- Wikidata
View/Edit Human	View/Edit Mouse

Insulin-like growth factor-binding protein 6 (IGFBP-6) is a protein that in humans is encoded by the IGFBP6 gene.
