= TMEM248 =

Protein-coding gene found in humans

Identifiers
- Aliases: TMEM248, C7orf42, transmembrane protein 248
- External IDs: MGI: 1918917; GeneCards: TMEM248

Gene location (Human)
Chr.	Chromosome 7 (human)
Band	7q11.21	Start	66,921,225 bp
Band	7q11.21	End	66,958,551 bp

Gene location (Mouse)
Chr.	Chromosome 5 (mouse)
Band	5|5 G1.3	Start	130,245,922 bp
Band	5|5 G1.3	End	130,272,606 bp
RNA expression pattern
Bgee	Human / Mouse (ortholog); Top expressed in: secondary oocyte; tendon of biceps brachii; stromal cell of endometrium; epithelium of colon; cartilage tissue; gallbladder; rectum; right lung; thoracic aorta; ascending aorta / Top expressed in: lacrimal gland; seminal vesicula; parotid gland; decidua; seminiferous tubule; otolith organ; utricle; islet of Langerhans; submandibular gland; vestibular membrane of cochlear duct; More reference expression data
BioGPS	n/a
Orthologs
Databases	NCBI: entry; OMA: entry
Species	Human	Mouse
Entrez	55069	71667
Ensembl	ENSG00000106609	ENSMUSG00000053094
UniProt	Q9NWD8	Q3TBN1
RefSeq (mRNA)	NM_017994	NM_001081394; NM_027854
RefSeq (protein)	NP_060464	NP_001074863; NP_082130
Location (UCSC)	Chr 7: 66.92 – 66.96 Mb	Chr 5: 130.25 – 130.27 Mb
PubMed search
- Wikidata
View/Edit Human	View/Edit Mouse

Transmembrane protein 248, also known as C7orf42, is a gene that in humans encodes the TMEM248 protein. This gene contains multiple transmembrane domains and is composed of seven exons.TMEM248 is predicted to be a component of the plasma membrane and be involved in vesicular trafficking. It has low tissue specificity, meaning it is ubiquitously expressed in tissues throughout the human body. Orthology analyses determined that TMEM248 is highly conserved, having homology with vertebrates and invertebrates. TMEM248 may play a role in cancer development. It was shown to be more highly expressed in cases of colon, breast, lung, ovarian, brain, and renal cancers.

== Gene ==
TMEM248 is located at chromosome 7 at location 7q11.21 with 37,327 base pairs, spanning from position 66,921,225 to 66,958,551. It has 7 exons and is located on the sense strand.

== Transcript ==
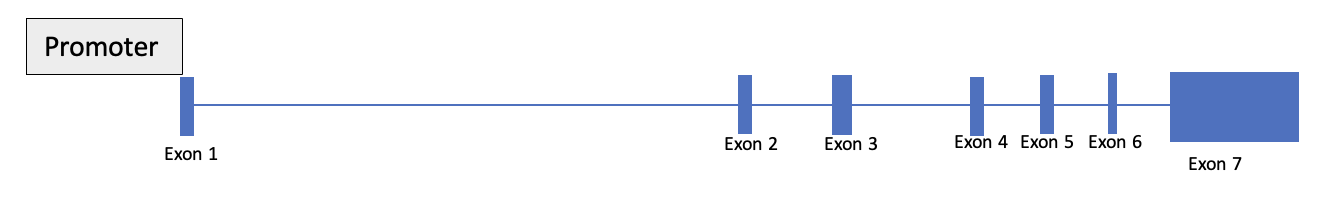
Figure 1. Bird's eye view of TMEM248 promoter region and gene.

TMEM248 contains 7 exons, seen in Figure 1. A single gene can have multiple isoforms produced by alternative splicing. TMEM248 has four isoforms summarized in Table 1.

Table 1. Isoforms of Homo Sapiens TMEM248 produced by alternative splicing.
Isoform Number	Accession number	Transcript Length	Protein Length	Molecular Weight
1	Q9NWD8-1, NM_017994.5	4,229	314	35 kDa
X1	XP_024302587.1	4,246	322	36 kDa
X2	XM_024446821.2	4,008	314	35 kDa
X3	XM_024446820.2	4,010	314	35 kDa

== Messenger RNA ==
Figure 2. Annotated conceptual translation of human TMEM248

An annotated conceptual translation of TMEM248 is seen in Figure 1. TMEM248 mRNA is most highly expressed in the thyroid, endometrium, prostate, testis, and ovaries, though it is ubiquitously expressed at varying levels in most tissue types.

== Protein ==
TMEM248 is a multi-pass component of the membrane and functions in protein binding and vesicular transport. TMEM248 has both low tissue and single cell type specificity, but single cell expression cluster is in macrophages. The polypeptide chain of TMEM248 is 314 amino acids long and the molecular weight is approximately 35 kDa. TMEM248 is threonine-rich, meaning that it has a higher-than-average amount of threonine residues. Additionally, it is a more acidic than basic molecule. The basal isoelectric point of TMEM248 is 5.91 pH.

=== Subcellular localization ===
Immunofluorescence staining shows TMEM248 localization to vesicles.The subcellular location of TMEM248 is predicted to be the endoplasmic reticulum membrane, in vesicles, and in the plasma membrane.

=== Post-translational modifications ===
Predicted post-translational modifications for TMEM248 protein include glycosylation, ubiquitylation, and phosphorylation. Ubiquitylation at K228, K240, and K245, glycosylation at N80, and phosphorylation at Y13 and S300 were experimentally determined.

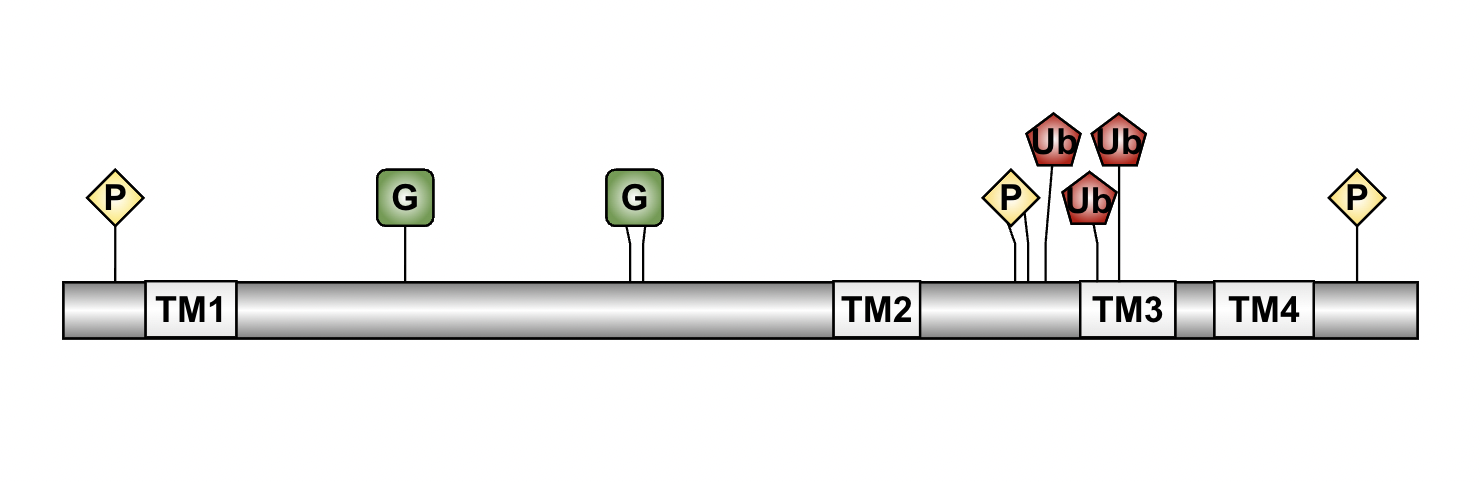
Figure 3. TMEM248 domain and post translational modification diagram. P represents phosphorylation sites, Ub represents ubiquitylation sites, and G represents glycosylation sites. TMEM (#) represents predicted transmembrane domains

== Homology and evolution ==
Homologs of the TMEM248 gene are found in vertebrates and invertebrates. The most distant orthologs of TMEM248 are in echinoderms, mollusks, and arthropods, which diverged approximately 680 million years ago. Orthologs of TMEM248 are not found in annelids, nematodes, cnidarians, sponges, fungi, plants, or bacteria.

Table 2. Summary of selection of TMEM248 orthologs.
Genus and Species	Common name	Order	DoD* (MYA)	Accession	Length	% Similarity	% Identity
Homo sapiens	Human	Primate	0	NP_060464.1	314	100	100
Mus musculus	House mouse	Rodentia	87	NP_082130.1	314	98.7	94.6
Phyllostomus discolor	Pale spear-nosed bat	Chiroptera	94	XP_028369740	314	99.4	96.5
Gallus gallus	Chicken	Galiformes	319	XP_024997905.1	324	95.2	90.4
Hirundo rustica	Barn swallow	Passeriformes	319	XP_039938558	314	95.9	91.1
Mauremys mutica	Yellow pond turtle	Testudines	319	XP_044849258	314	96.2	92.0
Bufo bufo	Common toad	Anura	353	XP_040279401	315	94.3	85.1
Xenopus tropicalis	Western clawed frog	Anura	353	NP_001007494.1	315	93.7	84.1
Geotrypetes seraphini	Gaboon caecilian	Gymnophiona	353	XP_033777821	313	93.9	88.5
Ictalurus punctatus	Channel catfish	Siluriformes	431	XP_017315532	315	92.1	81.0
Danio rerio	Zebrafish (teleost)	Cypriniformes	431	NP_001013548	314	88.0	76.5
Triplophysa tibetana	Stone loach (ray finned fish)	Cypriniformes	431	KAA0716418	332	88.0	78.0
Chiloscyllium plagiosum	White spotted bamboo shark	Orectolobiformes (carpet)	464	XP_043574478	321	92.5	83.8
Carcharodon carcharias	Great white shark	Lamniformes (mackerel)	464	XP_041053841	321	92.2	83.8
Strongylocentrotus purpuratus	Pacific purple sea urchin	Echinoida	619	XP_003725226.2	307	50.9	34.0
Apostichopus japonicus	Sea cucumber	Stichopodidae	619	PIK58986.1	244	37.0	19.1
Aplysia californica	California sea hare	Anaspidea	680	XP_005091558.1	372	43.6	27.9
Blattella germanica	German cockroach	Blattodea	680	PSN49789.1	275	48.4	30.8
Cryptotermes secundus	Drywood termite	Isoptera	680	XP_023712247.1	281	45.9	29.8
Parasteatoda tepidariorum	Common house spider	Araneae	680	XP_042905814.1	305	43.7	23.6
Mizuhopecten yessoensis	Yesso scallop	Pectinida	680	OWF52152	367	46.2	30.1
Plakobranchus ocellatus	Ring sap sucking slug	Saccoglossa	680	GFO37695.1	406	40.1	26.5

*DoD = date of divergence; MYA = million years ago.

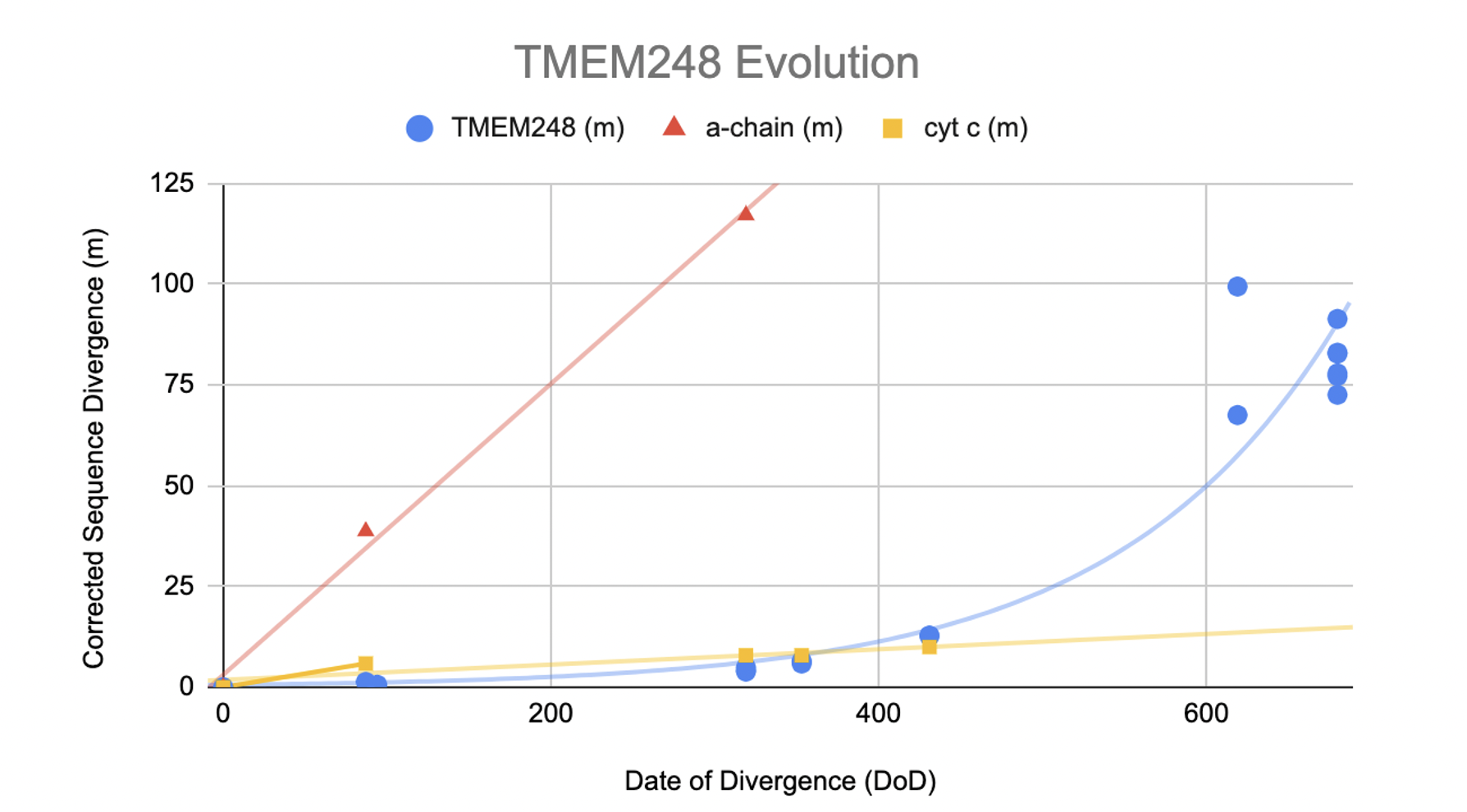
Figure 4. TMEM248 evolution and corrected sequence divergence compared to fibrinogen a-chain evolution (red) and cyt c evolution (yellow).

TMEM248 has two paralogs in humans: TMEM219 and insulin-like growth factor binding protein 3 (IGFBP3) receptor isoform 2 precursor. The TMEM219 protein has 34.9% similarity and 21.1% identity to TMEM248. The IGFBP3 receptor isoform 2 precursor protein has 36.4% similarity and 21.9% identity to TMEM248.

TMEM219 is a death receptor that induces apoptosis (a type of programmed cell death) via a caspase-8 dependent mechanism, and the ligand for this receptor is IGFBP3. The TMEM219/IGFBP3 signaling pathway is experimentally shown to regulate pancreatic beta cell function.

Table 3. Selection of Homo sapiens TMEM248 paralogs and their orthologs in other species.
Genus and Species	Common name	Order	DoD (MYA)	Accession	Length	% Similarity	% Identity
Homo sapiens TMEM219	Human	Primate	0	KAI2578024.1	213	34.9	21.1
Homo sapiens IGFBP3	Human	Primate	0	P_001356618.1	240	36.4	21.9
Mus musculus TMEM219	House mouse	Rodentia	87	AAH46763.1	240	34.9	21.1
Mus musculus IGFBP3	House mouse	Rodentia	87	NP_081103.1	240	36.8	21.4
Python bivittatus IGFBP3	Burmese python	Squamata	319	XP_007424393	242	40.5	21.8
Geotrypetes seraphini IGFBP3	Gaboon caecilian	Gymnophiona	353	XP_033802587	373	32.6	19.7
Denticeps clupeoides IGFBP3	Denticle herring	Clupeiformes	431	XP_028848129	300	40.7	19.8

== Clinical significance ==
TMEM248 has proposed connections to various forms of cancer. Mutations in the gene have been recorded in tumor samples from stomach, colorectal, lung, bladder, ovarian, endometrial, and breast cancer. Of the tumor samples observed, stomach tumors were most likely to contain mutations of TMEM248. There is relatively higher expression of TMEM248 in colon, breast, lung, ovarian, brain, and renal cancer. Multiple myeloma (cancer of unrestricted B cell proliferation in bone marrow) progression and drug sensitivity could regulate TMEM248 expression. These experimentally determined conclusions implicate TMEM248 playing a role in cell proliferation, and make expression of TMEM248 a potential candidate for more intensive studies in the development of cancer in these organs. However, the TMEM248 gene product is not prognostic for cancer with the current available research.
