= RNF103-CHMP3 readthrough =

Protein-coding gene in the species Homo sapiens

RNF103-CHMP3

Identifiers
- Aliases: RNF103-CHMP3, RNF103-VPS24, RNF103-CHMP3 readthrough, NEDF, hVps24, VPS24, CGI149, CHMP3
- External IDs: GeneCards: RNF103-CHMP3
Available structures
| PDB | Human UniProt search: PDBe RCSB |
| PDB | List of PDB id codes 2XZE, 3FRT, 3FRV, 2GD5 |

Gene location (Human)
| Chr. | Chromosome 2 (human) |
| Band | 2p11.2 | Start | 86,505,668 bp |
| Band | 2p11.2 | End | 86,721,122 bp |
RNA expression pattern
| Bgee | Human / Mouse (ortholog); Top expressed in: testicle; skeletal muscle tissue; gonad; granulocyte; tonsil; blood; gastrocnemius muscle; left ventricle; bone marrow; apex of heart / n/a; More reference expression data |
| BioGPS | n/a |
Gene ontology
| Molecular function | protein binding; phosphatidylcholine binding; protein homodimerization activity; ubiquitin-specific protease binding; identical protein binding |
| Cellular component | cytoplasm; membrane; plasma membrane; endosome; late endosome membrane; extracellular exosome; ESCRT III complex; cytosol; intracellular anatomical structure; late endosome; cytoplasmic vesicle; multivesicular body |
| Biological process | autophagosome maturation; viral life cycle; protein polymerization; multivesicular body assembly; cell cycle; cell division; regulation of mitotic spindle assembly; endosomal transport; regulation of centrosome duplication; apoptotic process; protein heterooligomerization; vacuolar transport; septum digestion after cytokinesis; protein transport; nucleus organization; mitotic metaphase plate congression; multivesicular body sorting pathway; regulation of exosomal secretion; macroautophagy; multivesicular body-lysosome fusion; regulation of early endosome to late endosome transport; transport; viral budding via host ESCRT complex; endosome transport via multivesicular body sorting pathway; late endosome to vacuole transport; midbody abscission |
Sources:Amigo / QuickGO
Orthologs
| Databases | NCBI: entry; OMA: entry |
| Species | Human | Mouse |
| Entrez | 100526767 | n/a |
| Ensembl | ENSG00000249884 | n/a |
| UniProt | Q9Y3E7 | n/a |
| RefSeq (mRNA) | NM_001198954 | n/a |
| RefSeq (protein) | NP_001005753; NP_001180446; NP_057163 | n/a |
| Location (UCSC) | Chr 2: 86.51 – 86.72 Mb | n/a |
| PubMed search | | n/a |
- Wikidata
| View/Edit Human |

RNF103-CHMP3 readthrough is a protein that in humans is encoded by the RNF103-CHMP3 gene.

== Function ==
This locus represents naturally occurring read-through transcription between the neighboring RNF103 (ring finger protein 103) and CHMP3 (charged multivesicular body protein 3) genes. The read-through transcript encodes a fusion protein that shares sequence identity with each individual gene product.
