= Glutamate-rich protein 4 =

ERICH4

Identifiers
- Aliases: ERICH4, C19orf69, glutamate rich 4
- External IDs: MGI: 3646269; HomoloGene: 86877; GeneCards: ERICH4; OMA:ERICH4 - orthologs

Gene location (Human)
Chr.	Chromosome 19 (human)
Band	19q13.2	Start	41,443,156 bp
Band	19q13.2	End	41,444,765 bp

Gene location (Mouse)
Chr.	Chromosome 7 (mouse)
Band	7|7 A3	Start	25,314,045 bp
Band	7|7 A3	End	25,315,317 bp
RNA expression pattern
Bgee	Human / Mouse (ortholog); Top expressed in: jejunal mucosa; mucosa of ileum; duodenum; human kidney; apex of heart; left ventricle; right lung; renal cortex; upper lobe of left lung; metanephros / Top expressed in: proximal tubule; jejunum; right kidney; human kidney; ileum; duodenum; yolk sac; colon; embryo; embryo; More reference expression data
BioGPS	n/a
Orthologs
Species	Human	Mouse
Entrez	100170765	632778
Ensembl	ENSG00000204978	ENSMUSG00000074261
UniProt	A6NGS2	Q3UNU4
RefSeq (mRNA)	NM_001130514	NM_001039243
RefSeq (protein)	NP_001123986	NP_001034332
Location (UCSC)	Chr 19: 41.44 – 41.44 Mb	Chr 7: 25.31 – 25.32 Mb
PubMed search
- Wikidata
View/Edit Human	View/Edit Mouse

Glutamate-rich protein 4 is a protein which in humans is encoded by the gene ERICH4 (previously C19orf69). ERICH4 is highly conserved in mammals and exhibits overexpression in tissues of the kidneys, terminal ileum, and duodenum. The function of ERICH4 has yet to be well understood by the scientific community.

== Gene ==
ERICH4 is located on the sense strand of 19q13.2 in humans, consists of 2,340 base pairs, and contains 2 exons. ERICH4, on the sense strand, is located within DMAC2 and next PCAT19 and B3NT8 which are all on the antisense strand.

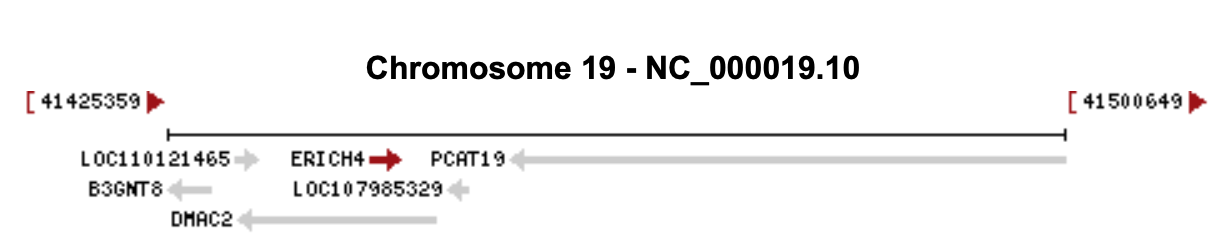
Genomic Neighborhood for ERICH4

=== Promoter & Predicted Transcription Factors (TF) ===
The promoter is predicted to begin 1,806 bp upstream from the 5' UTR and consists of 1,819 bp which overlaps with the coding sequence by 13 bp.

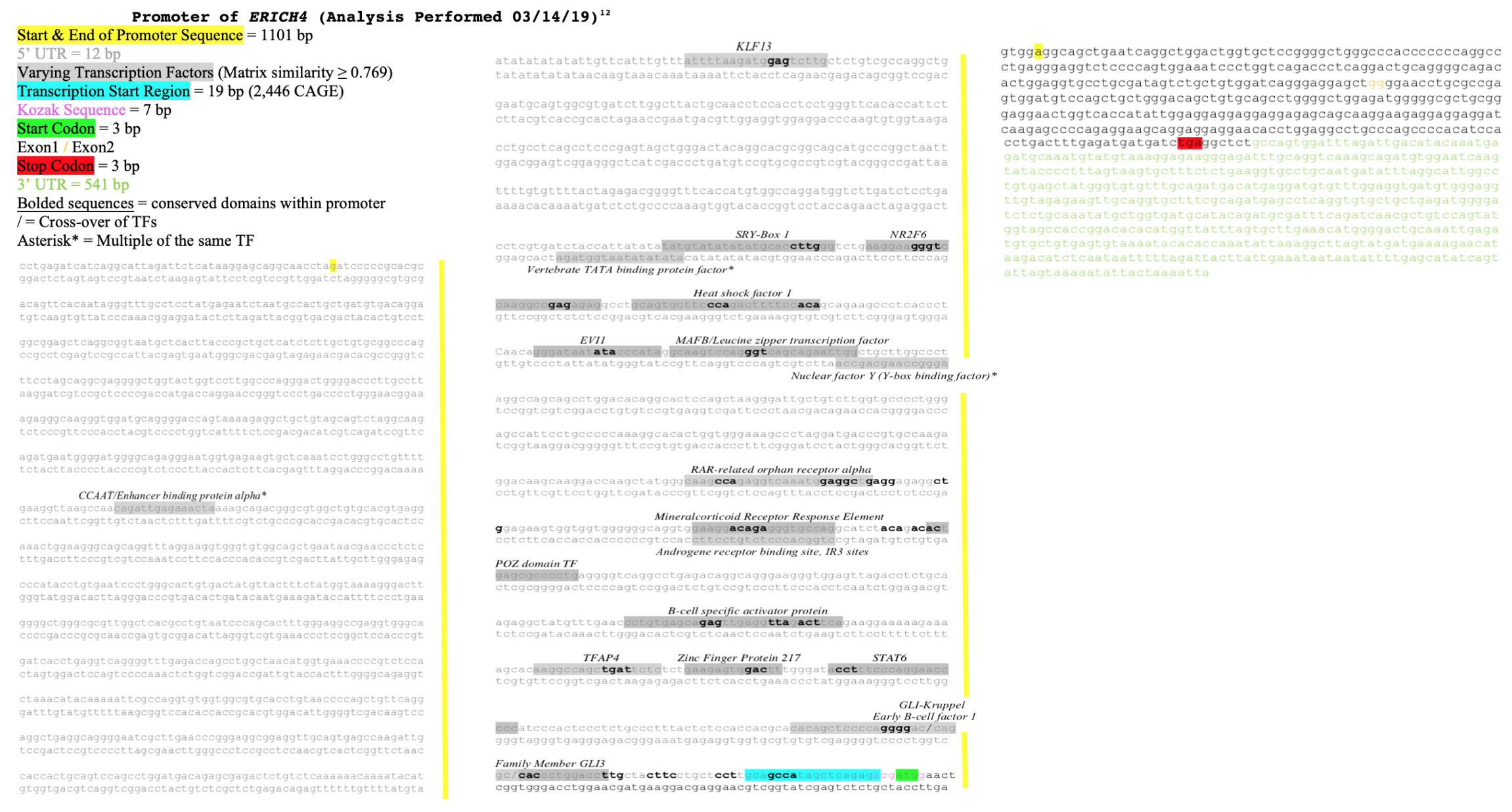
Conceptual Promoter Sequence and Transcription Factors for ERICH4

Matrix ID	TF Name	Genomic Position with Human ERICH4 Promoter	Strand of q19	Matrix Similarity	Literature Supported Function
V$CEBPA.01	CCAAT/Enhancer-binding Protein Alpha	41,441,752-41,441,766	Sense (+)	0.962	Recruit co-activators that in turn can open up chromatin structure or recruit basal transcription factors.
O$VTATA.01	Vertebrate TATA-binding Factor	41,442,466-41,442,482	Antisense (-)	0.915	Required for initiation of transcription and is associated with a variety of different transcription factors.
V$SOX1.04	SRY (Sex Determining Region)-Box 1	41,442,480-41,442,502	Sense (+)	0.801	Involved in the regulation of embryonic development and in the determination of the cell fate.
V$HSF1.04	Heat Shock Factor 1	41,442,536-41,442,560	Sense (+)	0.769	Activation in cellular stress.
V$BTEB3.01	Krueppel-like Factor 13 (KLF13)	41,442,243-41,442,261	Sense (+)	0.934	KLF13 knock-out mice show a defect in lymphocyte survival as KLF13 is a regulator of Bcl-xL expression.
V$PAX5.01	B-cell Specific Activator Protein	41,442,955-41,442,983	Sense (+)	0.796	Key role in B-lymphocyte development.
V$GLI3.02	GLI-Kruppel Family Member GLI3	41,443,115-41,443,131	Sense (+)	0.915	Thought to play a role during embryogenesis.
V$NR2F6.01	Nuclear Receptor subfamily 2 group F member 6 (NR2F6)	41,442,507-41,442,531	Sense (+)	0.851	Transcriptional repressor of IL17 expression in Th17-differentiated CD4-positive T cells in-vitro and in-vivo.
V$MAFB.01	MAFB/Leucine Zipper Transcription Factor	41,442,601-41,442,625	Sense (+)	0.923	Regulation of lineage-specific hematopoiesis. Represses ETS1-mediated transcription of erythroid-specific genes in myeloid cells.
V$AP4.03	Activating Enhancer Binding Protein 4 (TFAP4)	41,443,003-41,443,019	Sense (+)	0.993	Regulates the expression of genes involved in the regulation of cellular proliferation, stemness, and epithelial-mesenchymal transition.
V$EVI1.05	Ecotropic Viral Integration Site 1 (EVI1) Encoded Factor	41,442,583-41,442,599	Sense (+)	0.821	Regulation of hematopoietic stem cell renewal. Controls several aspects of embryonic development.
V$MRE.01	Mineralcorticoid Receptor Response Element	41,442,844-41,442,862	Sense (+)	0.939	Involved in water electrolyte homeostasis, blood pressure regulation, inflammation, and fibrosis in the renocardiovascular system.
V$ARE.03	Androgene Receptor Binding Site, IR3 Sites	41,442,844-41,442,862	Antisense (-)	0.946	Ligand-dependent transcription factor that controls the expression of specific genes. The binding of the AR to its native ligands 5α-dihydrotestosterone (DHT) and testosterone initiates male sexual development and differentiation.
V$ZNF217.01	Zinc Finger Protein 217	41,443,023-41,443,035	Sense (+)	0.911	Promotes cell proliferation and antagonizes cell death.
V$RORA.02	RAR-related Orphan Receptor Alpha, Homodimer DR5 Binding Site	41,442,783-41,442,807	Sense (+)	0.831	Possible role in lymphocyte development. Possible function in negatively regulating inflammation due to a report of positive relation in the expression of IKBa, a negative regulator of the NF-kB signaling pathway.
V$STAT6.01	Signal Transducer and Activator of Transcription 6 (STAT6)	41,443,042-41,443,060	Sense (+)	0.961	Plays a central role in exerting IL4-mediated responses.
V$ZF5.01	Zinc Finger/POZ Transcription Factor	41,442,874-41,442,888	Sense (+)	0.957	Role in development, oncogenesis, apoptosis, and transcription repression.

== mRNA ==
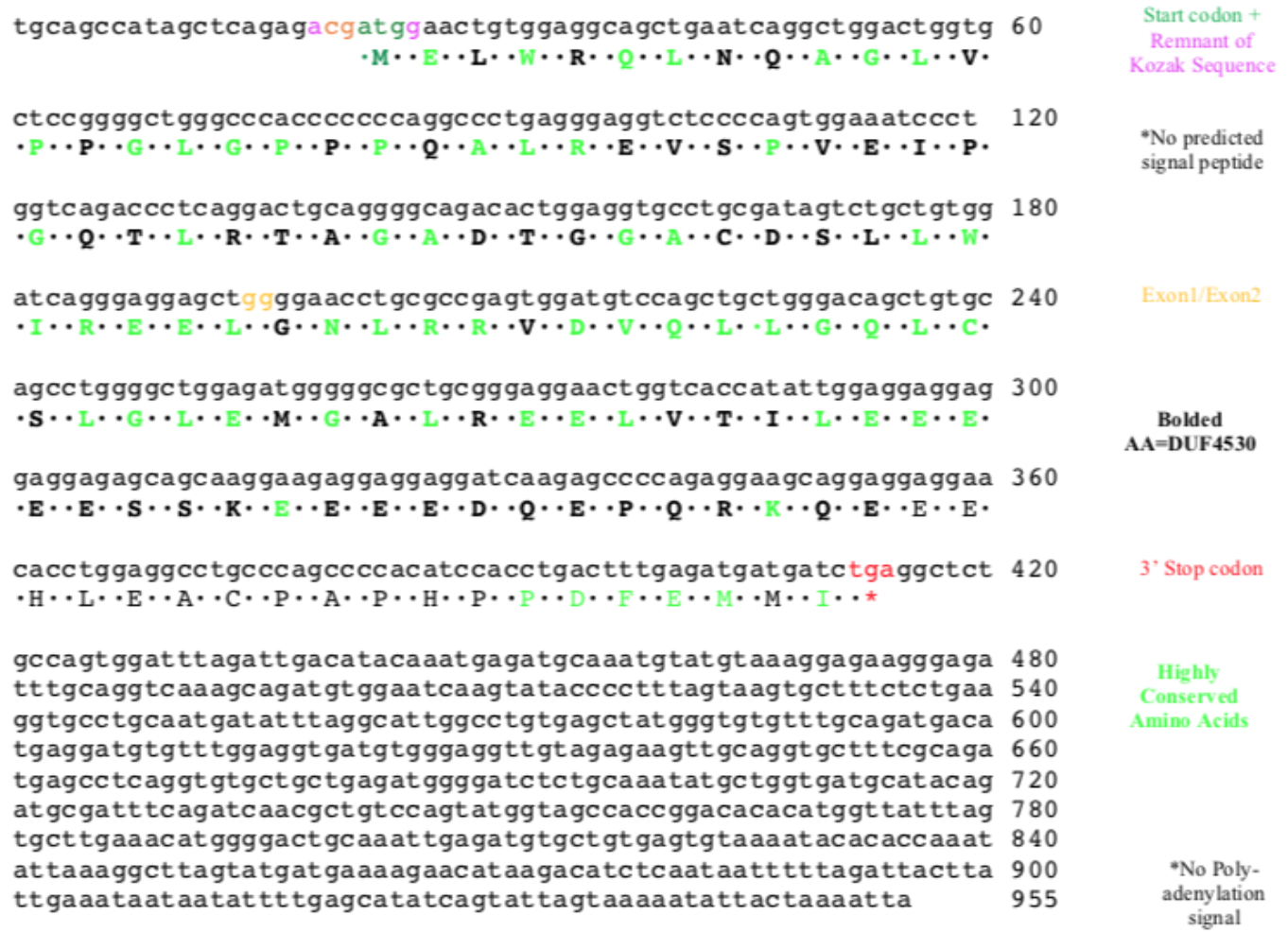
Conceptual Translation of ERICH4

The ERICH4 mRNA sequence is 955 nucleotides in length with a fold energy predicted as -139.80 kcal/mol with -0.258 energy/base.

=== Alternative Splicing ===
ERICH4 has one different protein-encoding transcript variant, or isoform.

Name	mRNA Length (bp)	Protein Length (aa)	Mass (Da)
Glutamate-rich protein 4	955	130	14,447
Glutamate-rich protein 4 isoform X1	1741	155	N/A

== Protein ==
=== General Properties ===
The primary encoded protein consists of 130 amino acids and has a predicted molecular mass of 14.5 kDa and isoelectric point of 4 pI. As suggested by the protein's name, glutamate-rich protein 4, the protein is most highly composed of glutamic acid amino acids at 17.7% of the protein's composition followed by leucine at 14.6%, and then proline at 9.2%. ERICH4 has no positive or negative charge clusters. The human protein has one identifiable mixed cluster from amino acid 91 to 116 with 3 positively-charged, 15 negatively-charged, and 8 neutral amino acids. The same mixed cluster region in humans is frequently negative within ERICH4's orthologous proteins. This protein contains no significant hydrophobic or transmembrane segments which are supported with comparison to five of ERICH4's orthologs (Graymouse lemur, Sheep, House mouse, African elephant, and Opossum).

=== Domains ===
ERICH4 has one identified domain of unknown function, DUF4530, which is found in eukaryotes. Proteins in this family are typically 140 amino acids in length and ERICH4 is a known human member of this family.

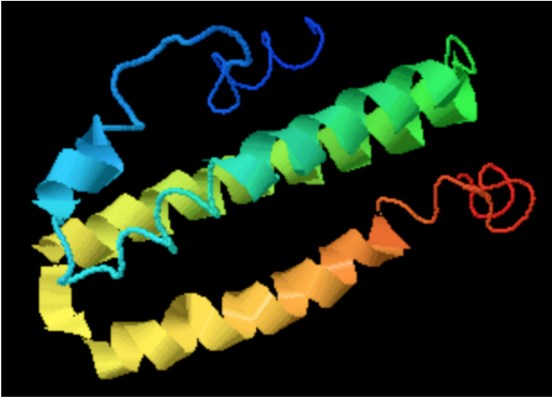
Proposed Tertiary Structure for ERICH4

=== Secondary Structure ===
A cross-program analysis determines ERICH4 protein to be composed of five separated alpha helixes and five interspersing coils. The alpha helix segments span from amino acids 2-9, 21-24, 47-58, 61-94, and 104-111 in the protein sequence. ERICH4 is not predicted to contain beta-sheets.

=== Tertiary Structure ===
Program analysis in SWISS-Model proposes a tertiary structure for ERICH4 by matching the protein against the template of NLRP6 with a sequence identity of 25.79%, sequence similarity of 0.30, and coverage of 0.43 for amino acids 43-92 in ERICH4.

=== Post-translational Regulation ===
ERICH4 has proposed phosphorylation at serine amino acids 28 and 96 and amino acid 36, a threonine, by casein kinase II and protein kinase c, respectively. ERICH4 is not predicted to be undergo a methionine cleavage or acetylation.

=== Localization ===
This protein is predicted to be intracellular without any transmembrane regions. Sub-cellular localization is predicted to be mostly localized to the cytoplasm with a reliability score of 70.6 via the Reinhardt's method. No significant O-GlcNAc site and N-myristoylation predictions.

== Tissue Expression ==
ERICH4’s highest levels of expression are within human tissue of the duodenum and small intestine, followed by the kidneys. Notably, expression within the small intestines is highest in the twentieth week of human fetal development. Within a representative set of mouse (Mus musculus) tissues, Erich4 is most highly expressed within the kidneys, followed by and in decreasing expression, the large intestines, adult duodenum, and adult small intestine. The Sigma-Aldrich antibody product, HPA042632, derived from rabbit, has a strong granular cytoplasmic positivity in cytoplasmic structure in glandular cells (goblet cells) of the rectum.

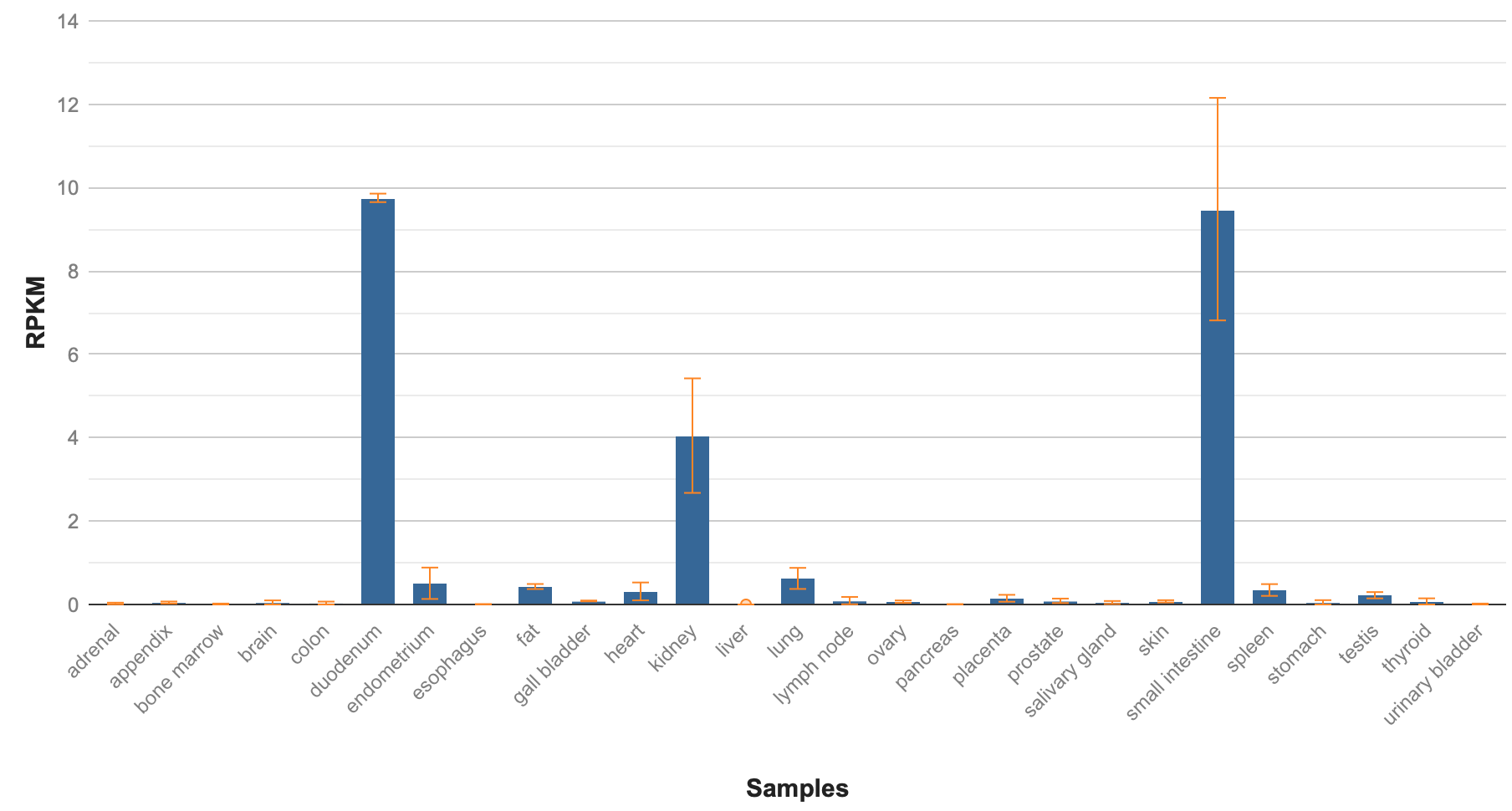
Tissue specificity of ERICH4 determined from RNA sequencing of human tissue.

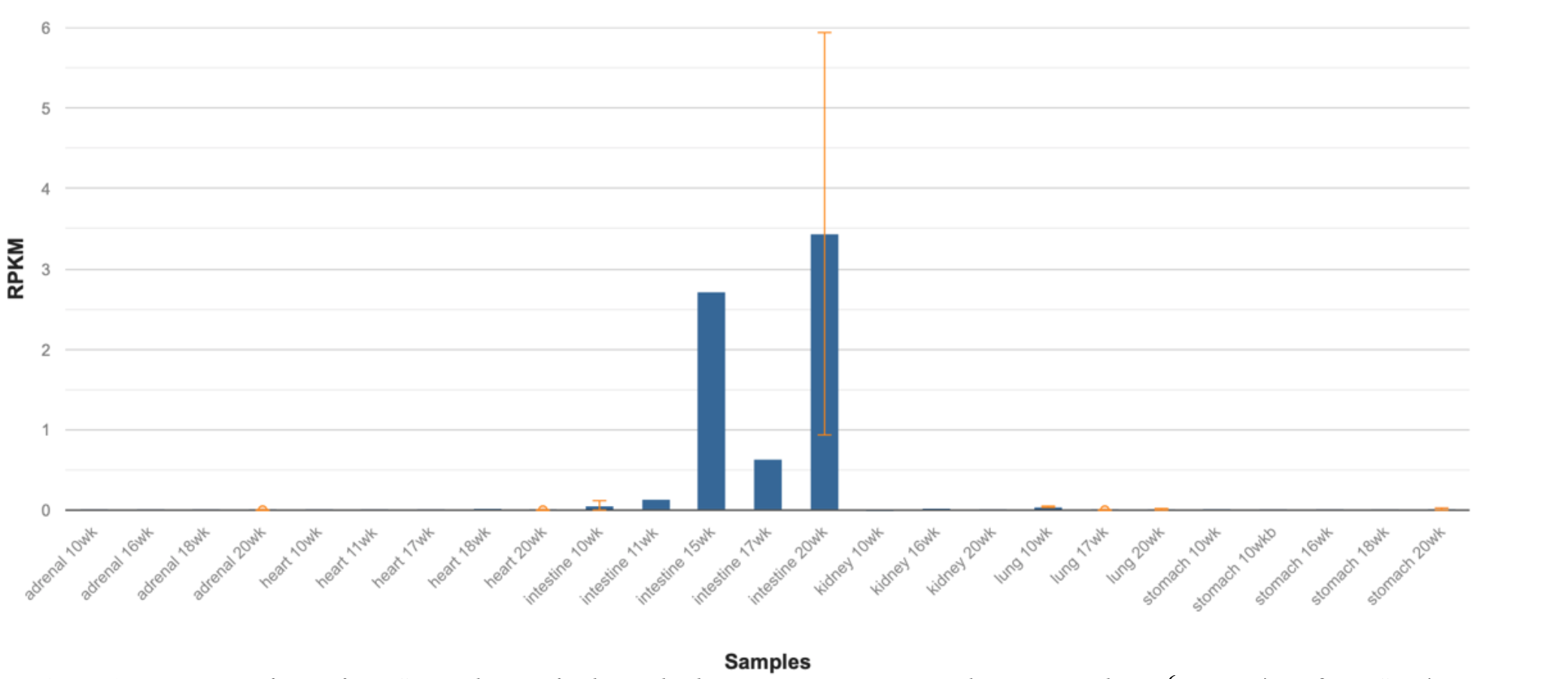
Tissue specificity of ERICH4 in human fetal samples between ten and twenty weeks gestational time.

=== Abnormal Tissue Expression ===
ERICH4 has high expression within normal tissue and low-to-medium expression with renal cell carcinoma tissue.

An analysis examining ERICH4 was reviewed in tissues of the ileum and colon that were either normal or afflicted with Crohn's disease or ulcerative colitis. ERICH4 had high (~90%) expression within the ileum for all states (normal/control, Crohn's disease, and ulcerative colitis). ERICH4 also has a higher expression in Crohn's disease than in either normal tissue or ulcerative colitis.

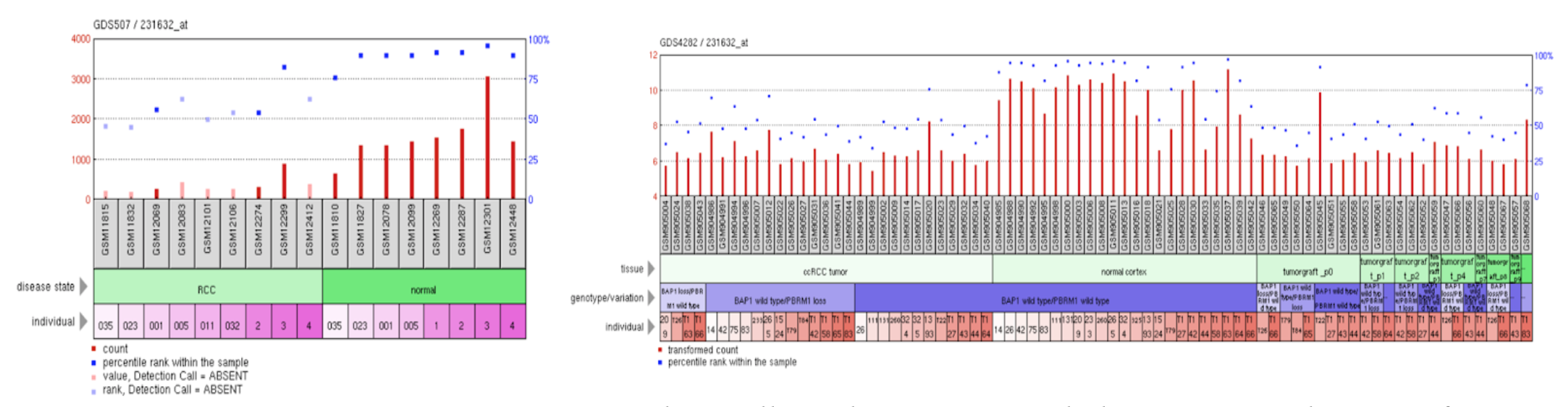
ERICH4 gene expression in clear-cell renal carcinoma including tumors and tumografts deficient for tumor suppressor BAP1 or PBRM1.

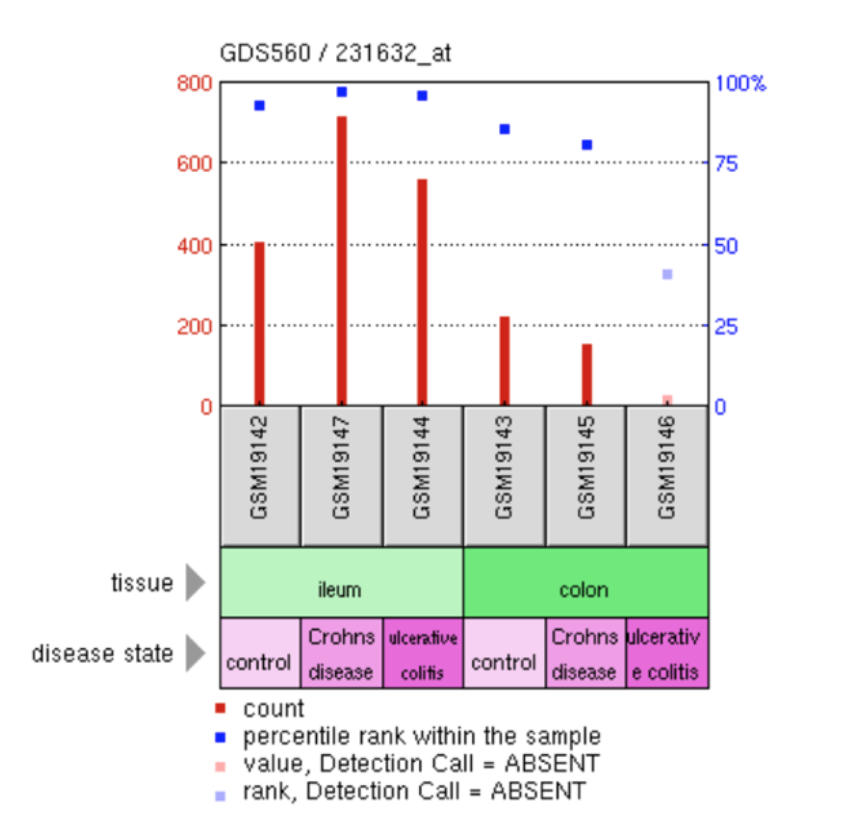
Microarray analysis of ERICH4 gene expression within intestinal tissue of the ileum and colon from probands with Crohn's disease, Ulcerative Colitis, or control patients.

== Function ==
The function of ERICH4 has yet to be well understood by the scientific community and therefore, requires further research.

=== Interactions ===
According to STRING analysis, ERICH4 has multiple predicted interactions with other proteins including proteins with associated immune function and expression within the gastrointestinal tract or testes from textmining. No experimentally confirmed protein interactions yet.

Predicted Partner Protein	Score	Associated Functions
Tetratricopeptide Repeat Domain 29 (TTC29)	0.680	Shown to be significantly upregulated during wound healing of human masticatory mucosa.
Transmembrane Protein 184A (TMEM184A)	0.552	Functions as a heparin receptor and mediates anti-inflammatory responses of ECs involving decreased JNK and p38 activity.
Insulin-like Growth Factor binding protein Acid Labile Subunit (IGFALS)	0.509	Serum protein that binds insulin-like growth factors, increasing their half-life and their vascular localization.
Serine Peptidase Inhibitor, Kazal type 4 (SPINK4)	0.500	Has been shown to exhibit Celiac disease pathology-related differential gene expression, likely derived from altered goblet cell activity.
Protein Disulfide-Isomerase-Like protein of the Testis (PDILT)	0.497	Catalyzes protein folding and thiol-disulfide interchange reactions. This protein lacks oxidoreductase activity in vitro and is suspected to function as a chaperone.

== Homology ==
=== Paralogs ===
No human paralogs were found for the gene.

=== Orthologs ===
Orthologs have been identified in most mammals for which complete genome data is available. Notably, ERICH4 orthologs are only present in placental and marsupial mammals but absent in monotremes. The most distant ortholog was identified in the gray short-tailed opossum which is a marsupial mammal.

No significant similarities were found in the vertebrates Aves, Reptilia, Amphibia, Chondrichthyes, Osteichthyes or Agnatha. Searching to exclude vertebrates in BLAST and BLAT produced no significant ortholog findings for invertebrates, fungi, and bacteria.

Species	Common name	NCBI Accession Number	Sequence length (AA)	Millions of Years since LCA	% Identity	% Similarity	Taxonomic group
Homo sapiens	Human	NP_001123986.1	130	---	100	100	Primates
Microcebus murinus	Gray mouse lemur	XP_012616209.1	179	73	72	80	Primates
Tupaia chinensis	Northern treeshrew	XP_006165343.1	137	85	63	72	Scandentia
Mus pahari	Gairdner's shrewmouse	XP_021075502.1	141	88	57	63	Rodentia
Meriones unguiculatus	Mongolian gerbil	XP_021519873.1	141	88	60	64	Rodentia
Rattus norvegicus	Brown rat	NP_001102923.1	147	88	61	65	Rodentia
Mus musculus	House mouse	NP_001034332.2	140	88	62	71	Rodentia
Microtus ochrogaster	Prairie vole	XP_005361243.1	140	88	62	71	Rodentia
Erinaceus europaeus	European hedgehog	XP_007536664.1	129	94	61	68	Eulipotyphla
Orcinus orca	Killer whale	XP_004271419.2	121	94	62	72	Cetacea
Physeter catodon	Sperm whale	XP_007128192.1	121	94	64	72	Cetacea
Desmodus rotundus	Common vampire bat	XP_024433457.1	180	94	66	73	Chiroptera
Ovis aries	Sheep	XP_012045823.2	131	94	69	75	Artiodactyla
Bos taurus	Cattle	XP_002695042.1	131	94	69	75	Artiodactyla
Pteropus alecto	Black flying fox	XP_006910763.1	133	94	71	78	Chiroptera
Hipposideros armiger	Great roundleaf bat	XP_019488166.1	134	94	71	79	Chiroptera
Loxodonta africana	African bush elephant	XP_003420798.1	127	102	58	66	Proboscidea
Monodelphis domestica	Gray short-tailed opossum	XP_007492011.1	106	160	45	61	Didelphimorphia
Phascolarctos cinereus	Koala	XP_020834126.1	109	160	48	63	Diprotodontia
Vombatus ursinus	Common wombat	XP_027701859.1	109	160	49	64	Diprotodontia

=== Molecular Evolution ===
The m value, or number of corrected amino acid changes per 100 residues, for the gene ERICH4 was plotted against the divergence of species in millions of years. When compared to the data of hemoglobin, fibrinogen alpha chain, and cytochrome C, it was determined that the gene has the closest progression to fibrinogen alpha chain, suggesting a relatively rapid pace of evolution. M values for ERICH4 were derived from percentage of identity of species protein sequences compared to the human sequence using the formula derived from the Molecular Clock Hypothesis.
