= CFAP276 =

Human gene

An Error has occurred retrieving Wikidata item for infobox Cilia- and flagella-associated protein 276 is a protein that in humans is encoded by the gene CFAP276 (previously C1orf194). The function of the protein CFAP276 is still not fully understood by the scientific community, but it is found in the axoneme of cilia, which explains its name.

== Gene ==
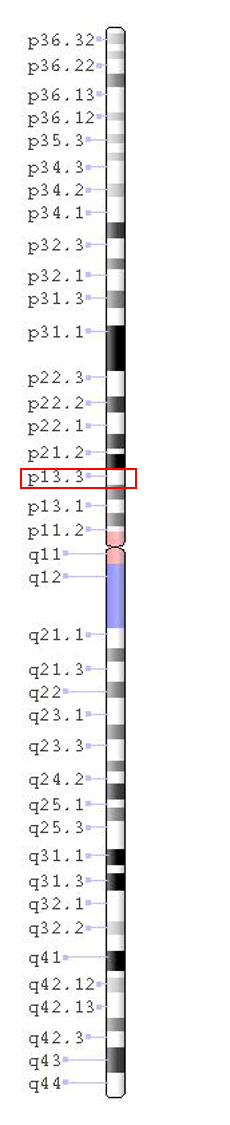
C1orf194 is located on chromosome 1 loci p13.3 (1p13.3)

C1orf194 is located on the sense strand of chromosome 1 at loci p13.3. Alternative splicing results in five different isoforms for this gene composed of any combination of six exons. C1orf194 is located near the KIAA1324 gene, poly(rC) binding protein 1 pseudogene, small Cajal body-specific RNA 2 gene, and the seryl-tRNA synthetase gene. KIAA1324 is the closest gene neighbor to C1orf194 located 86bp from the start of C1orf194 on the non-sense strand of chromosome 1.

=== Transcript ===
C1orf194 is composed of a total of six exons.

== Protein ==
While the primary function of the protein encoded by this gene is still not understood by the scientific community, it is known to be present within ependymal tumors, specifically adult spinal ependymoma when reciprocally fused with UQCR10. There also seems to be a higher relative abundance of the protein found in the testes and lungs compared to other locations within the body. Variants 1, 2, and 4 of the gene code for a protein, while variants 3 and 5 code for a nonsense mediated decay.

== Homology ==
When the mouse gene equivalent to this gene is aligned next to it there is only 13.2% identity. The gorilla homolog has a high identity with 64.3%.

The gene C1orf194 has one paralogue found within the human genome hCG39930. This sequence is 98% identical and 97% similar. With these numbers being so high, it was initially believed to be an alias to one of the gene’s isoform. After, careful comparison this was not the case as its length did not match any of the known isoforms.[1]

With the discovery of only one paralog, one can believe that the gene family is not large. But the amount of orthologs found for this gene leads one to assume that it has been highly conserved in one form or another through a variety of organisms. An ortholog was found within invertebrates, bacteria, plants, fish, amphibians, reptiles, birds, marsupials, placental mammals, and primates.
