= NephroCheck =

NephroCheck is a test that tries to determine the risk of some who is seriously sick developing acute kidney injury. Whether or not the test improves outcomes, however, is unclear as of 2016.

NephroCheck tests for the presence of insulin-like growth-factor binding protein 7 (IGFBP7) and tissue inhibitor of metalloproteinases (TIMP-2) in the urine, which are associated with acute kidney injury. The laboratory test was developed by Astute Medical, in San Diego, California.
