= ARL6IP4 =

Protein-coding gene in humans

Identifiers
- Aliases: ARL6IP4, SFRS20, SR-25, SRp25, SRrp37, ADP ribosylation factor like GTPase 6 interacting protein 4
- External IDs: OMIM: 607668; MGI: 1929500; HomoloGene: 9606; GeneCards: ARL6IP4; OMA:ARL6IP4 - orthologs

Gene location (Human)
Chr.	Chromosome 12 (human)
Band	12q24.31	Start	122,980,060 bp
Band	12q24.31	End	122,982,913 bp

Gene location (Mouse)
Chr.	Chromosome 5 (mouse)
Band	5|5 F	Start	124,254,152 bp
Band	5|5 F	End	124,256,259 bp
RNA expression pattern
Bgee	Human / Mouse (ortholog); Top expressed in: Pituitary Gland; anterior pituitary; Amygdala; popliteal artery; muscle layer of sigmoid colon; tibial arteries; fundus; right frontal lobe; prostate; anterior cingulate cortex / Top expressed in: Ileal epithelium; internal carotid artery; external carotid artery; facial motor nucleus; primitive streak; hair follicle; motor neuron; superior surface of tongue; Paneth cell; fossa; More reference expression data
BioGPS	n/a
Gene ontology
Molecular function	protein binding; RNA binding
Cellular component	nuclear speck; nucleolus; nucleus
Biological process	mRNA processing; RNA splicing
Sources:Amigo / QuickGO
Orthologs
Species	Human	Mouse
Entrez	51329	65105
Ensembl	ENSG00000182196	ENSMUSG00000029404
UniProt	Q66PJ3	Q9JM93
RefSeq (mRNA)	NM_001002251; NM_001002252; NM_001278378; NM_001278379; NM_001278380 NM_016638; NM_018694	NM_144509
RefSeq (protein)	NP_001002251; NP_001002252; NP_001265307; NP_001265308; NP_001265309 NP_057722; NP_061164	NP_653092
Location (UCSC)	Chr 12: 122.98 – 122.98 Mb	Chr 5: 124.25 – 124.26 Mb
PubMed search
- Wikidata
View/Edit Human	View/Edit Mouse

ADP-ribosylation-like factor 6 interacting protein 4 (ARL6IP4), also called SRp25 is the product of the ARL6IP4 gene located on chromosome 12q24. 31. Its function is unknown.

== Structure ==
It is 360 amino acids in length. It is expressed ubiquitously but only in G1/S phase of the cell cycle. The human and mouse mRNAs of this protein have 77% homology.

Two types of amino acid clusters have been observed, a serine cluster and a basic cluster.

== Function ==
Its function(s) are unknown. However, due to sequence homology of its protein with SR splicing factors, it is widely believed that the protein is nuclear and may have a role in splicing regulation. The protein is believed to be a mediator in the RAC1 signalling pathway.

== RNA editing ==
The pre-mRNA of the ARL6IP4 gene product is subject to RNA Editing.

=== Type ===
A to I RNA editing is catalyzed by a family of adenosine deaminases acting on RNA (ADARs) that specifically recognize adenosines within double-stranded regions of pre-mRNAs and deaminate them to inosine. Inosines are recognised as guanosine by cellular translational machinery. ADAR 1 and ADAR 2 are the only enzymatically active members. ADAR3 is thought to have a regulatory role in the brain. ADAR1 and ADAR 2 are widely expressed in tissues while ADAR 3 is restricted to the brain. The double stranded regions of RNA are formed by base-pairing between residues in the region close to the editing site with residues usually in a neighboring intron but can be an exonic sequence. The region that base pairs with the editing region is known as an Editing Complementary Sequence (ECS).

=== Location ===
Editing occurs at a K/R editing site within amino acid position 225 of the final protein. Using RT-PCR and sequencing of 100 individual clones, 7% of isoform 3 of the protein showed a G instead of an A at this position during sequencing. Other minor editing sites may be potentially present including some in the same exon as the major editing site. As is the case of IGFBP7, pre-mRNA, editing is unusual as the RNA fold back structure is made up off exonic sequence only.

=== Effects on protein structure ===
Editing at this site results in a codon changed from a Lysine to an Arginine. This occurs in a highly basic region of the protein.

=== Effects on protein function ===
The function of the unedited protein is largely uncharacterised. Therefore, the effect of editing on the pre-mRNA on the proteins function is also unknown. The amino acid change is conservative and is unlikely to massively alter protein function. However, the editing site may be important since the amino acid being altered is a Lysine, which may be involved in the regulation of protein expression. Lysines can be sites of post-translational modification and the conversion of Lysine to an Arginine could affect post-translational modification.
