= Escargot (transcription factor) =

Type of gene

Identifiers
- Organism: Drosophila melanogaster
- Symbol: Dmel/esg
- Orthologs: OMA: entry
- UniProt: P25932
Search for
- Structures: Swiss-model
- Domains: InterPro

Escargot (esg) is a transcription factor expressed in Drosophila melanogaster. It is responsible for the maintenance of intestinal stem cells and is used as a marker for those types of cells in Drosophila. Apart from its expression in the gut, esg is also expressed in germline stem cells and cyst stem cells of the testis and, during development, in neural stem cells and imaginal disks.

== Discovery ==
In the year 1992, Mary Whiteley and coworkers identified a gene which is very similar to Drosophila Snail gene and named it escargot. They found that it encodes for zinc finger like snail related genes.

== Pathways associated with escargot ==
=== Delta-Notch signaling ===
Esg acts through the Notch signaling pathway to repress differentiation-related genes in the Drosophila gut. Intestinal stem cells produce the ligand for the Notch receptor i.e., Delta which activates a transcriptional program that leads to the differentiation of enteroblasts to enterocytes and Escargot represses this. Esg and Scratch act redundantly to determine neural commitment in sensory cells by antagonizing Notch activity which is required for neuronal fate determination by regulating the number of neural precursor cells and also by directing the cells fates to their neural type lineages. Esg along with scratch were reported to be involved in assigning neural commitment and induce neural cell type fates in Drosophila mechanosensory organ lineage cells.

=== Insulin receptor pathway ===
Esg is required for the maintenance of somatic cyst stem cells in their stem state. The testis in Drosophila has two types of stem cells: the germline stem cells and the somatic cyst stem cells. Germline stem cells divide to generate a daughter gonialblast and a germline stem cell. The gonialblast undergoes mitotic transit-amplifying divisions to produce spermatocytes which will eventually give rise to haploid spermatids. On the other hand, cyst stem cells generate cyst cells and cyst stem cells. Cyst stem cells/cyst cells encapsulate the gonialblast and differentiate with differentiating germline and act analogously to the mammalian sertoli cells. Drosophila insulin-like peptide signaling pathway is required for the differentiation of dividing cyst stem cells. Esg overexpression enhances the activity of imaginal morphogenesis protein-late 2 (ImpL2) (fly homolog of mammalian insulin-like growth factor binding protein IGFBP7), which is required to prevent the differentiation of dividing cyst stem cells and there by maintains the cyst stem cells in stem cell state.

=== FGF signaling ===
Fibroblast growth factor signaling is important for trachea development in insects. Branching morphogenesis of the tracheal system in Drosophila is governed by FGF signaling. The primordial tip cells expressing Branchless/Breathless will initiate the primary branching and migration. The tip cells get differentiated into fusion cells or terminal cells. Fusion cells will get differentiated into different type of cells while terminal cells form cytoplasmic extensions with intracellular lumen. Esg regulates the diversification of branching tip cells by inhibiting the FGF signaling.

== Esg homologs ==
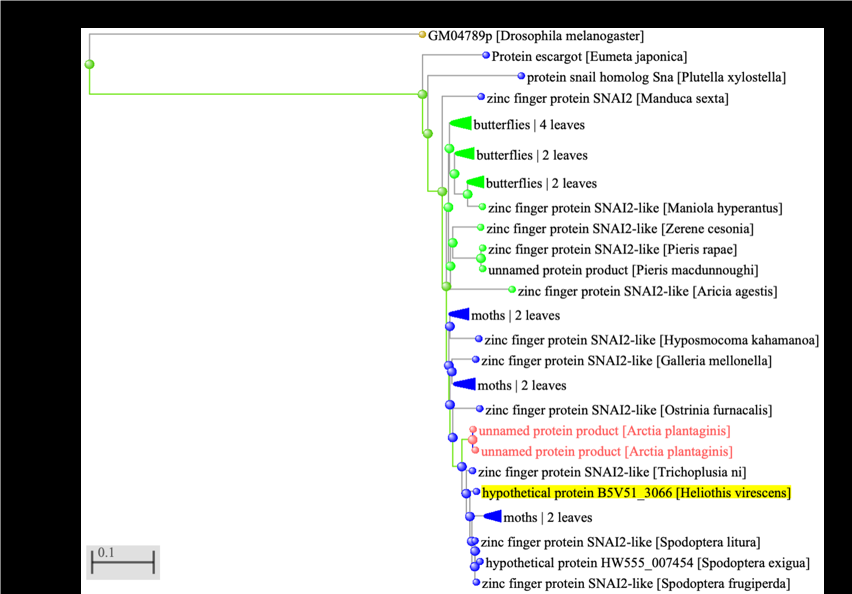
Phylogenetic tree of D. melanogaster esg sequence

The Snail-related zinc-finger transcription factor family has been implicated in stem cell maintenance in the model insect, the fly D. melanogaster. There are three Snail family members in D. melanogaster: escargot (esg), snail, and worniu. After the initial cloning of snail in D. melanogaster, additional snail-orthologues have been isolated in other animals including Tribolium castaneum (beetle), Achaearanea tepidariorum (spider), the frog Xenopus laevis, chicken, and mouse. Besides snail, D. melanogaster encodes five snail paralogs including esg, worniu, scratch, scratch-like 1, and scratch-like 2. The Snail family is part of the larger Snail superfamily, which comprises Snail and Scratch families. The Snail family members snail, esg and worniu are involved in forming variable structures in D. melanogaster by functioning in several cellular process like cell behavior, cell shape, cell asymmetric divisions, cell fate regulation and cell differentiation, while D. melanogaster scratch mainly promotes neural cell fate. Recently, esg orthologue was identified in the genome of the lepidopteran Chloridea virescens.

== Esg and tumors ==
Intra-tumour heterogeneity (ITH) is the altered and diverse morphological, genetic, epigenetic, transcriptomic and metabolomic states of cancerous cells. The somatic epithelial cells of the Drosophila ovary emerge from germline stem cells to form polarized follicle cells that establish the monolayered epithelia which surrounds the germline cells within an egg chamber. Drosophila ovarian follicle cell model was used to study the ITH. Heterogeneity was induced in the follicle cells in-situ. It was discovered that loss of cell polarity induces heterogenous multilayering. Esg was upregulated in the heterogenous cell population down stream of Upd/Jak-STAT signaling and maintains the non-polar cells. This can be extrapolated to the cancer-associated fibroblasts which communicate with tumour cells via IL-6/STAT3 and this regulates cancer stem cell maintenance via Snail.

== Functions ==
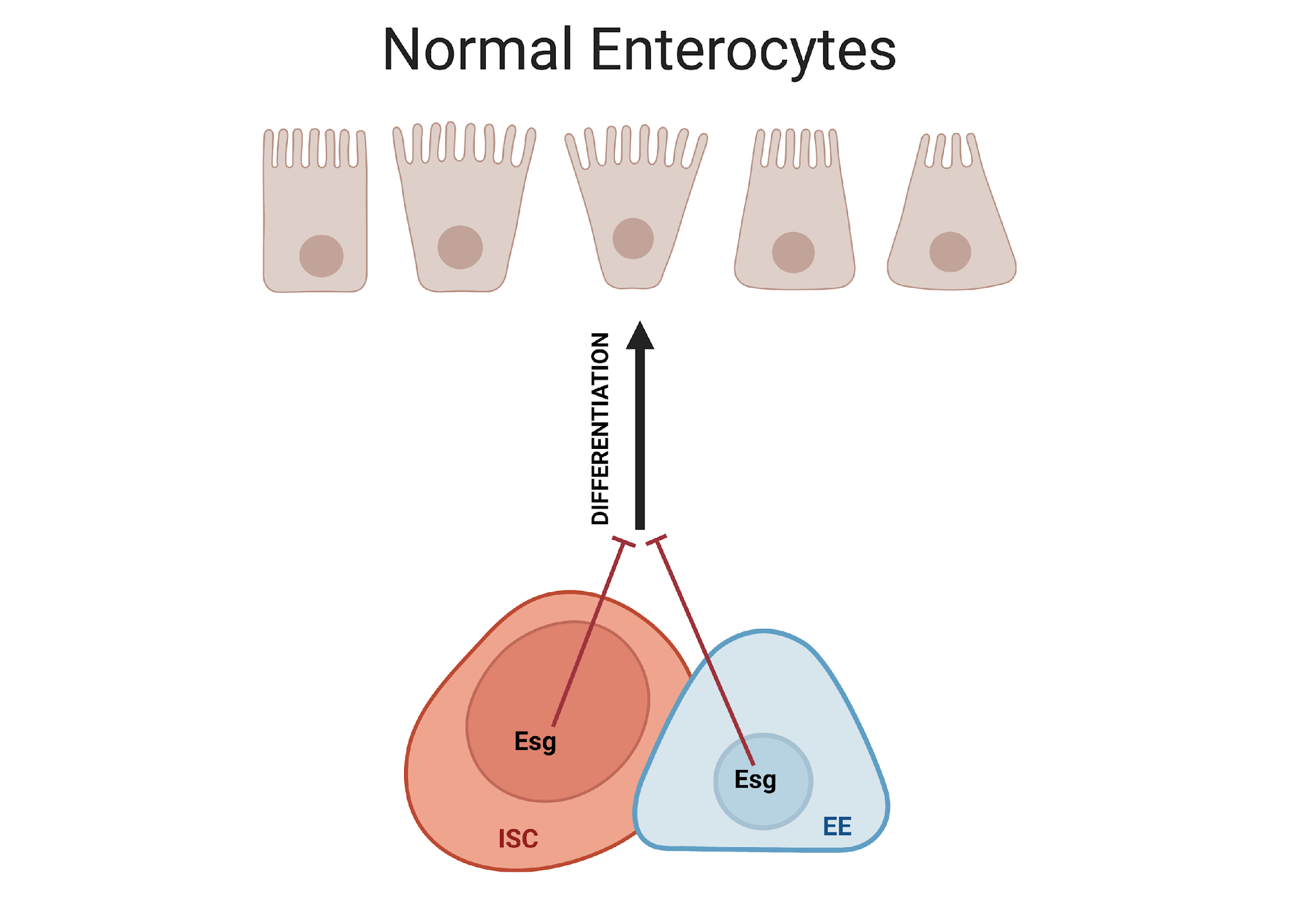
Hypothesized function of escargot in insect gut ISC - Instestinal stem cell; EE - Enteroendocrine cell

Esg is expressed in the blastoderm stage in dorsal surface of the embryo, cephalic furrow, and lateral and medial columns of neurectoderm. During the latter stage of embryogenesis, esg is expressed in primordial cells responsible for the development of wings, halteres, genital and abdominal tissues. Other functions of the esg include:

- Esg maintains diploidy in imaginal cells. Esg mutant flies showed polyploid abdominal histoblasts. When esg is expressed in by heat shock promoter it rescues the polyploid phenotype of histoblasts.
- Esg is involved in labial and antennal imaginal disc development. When esg expression is downregulated in Drosophila antennal disc, DE-cadherin amount decreases and the expression domains of cubitus interruptus (ci) and engrailed (en) are affected resulting in structural malformations in antennae and maxillary palps. While reduced esg transcripts in the labial discs causes complete loss of the proboscis.
- Esg controls somatic stem cell maintenance through repressing insulin receptor pathway.
- Gain-of-function mutations in esg in neurons suppresses seizures
- Esg promotes neuronal differentiation through the inhibition of daughterless/HEB that maintain the stem cell niche
- Esg maintains stemness in intestinal stem cells and intestinal homeostasis by suppressing the expression of genes such as Pdm-1 which promote differentiation of the progenitor cells.
