= IGFBP3 =

Protein-coding gene in the species Homo sapiens

Identifiers
- Aliases: IGFBP3, BP-53, IBP3, insulin like growth factor binding protein 3
- External IDs: OMIM: 146732; MGI: 96438; GeneCards: IGFBP3

Gene location (Human)
Chr.	Chromosome 7 (human)
Band	7p12.3	Start	45,912,245 bp
Band	7p12.3	End	45,921,874 bp

Gene location (Mouse)
Chr.	Chromosome 11 (mouse)
Band	11 A1|11 4.75 cM	Start	7,156,086 bp
Band	11 A1|11 4.75 cM	End	7,163,923 bp
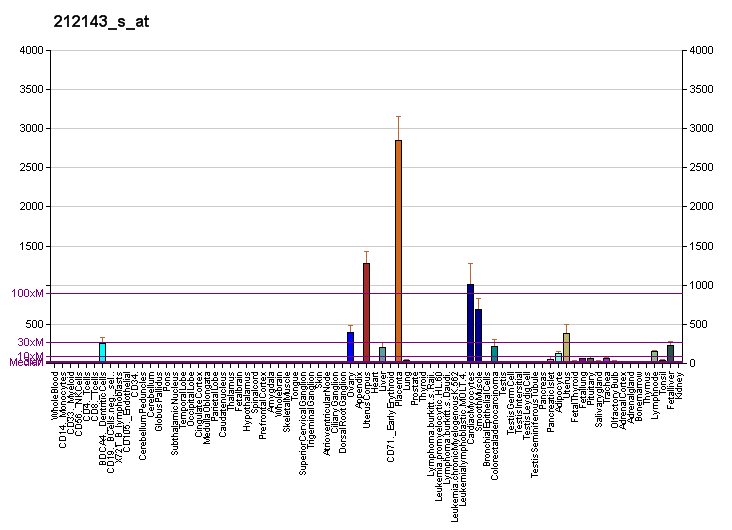

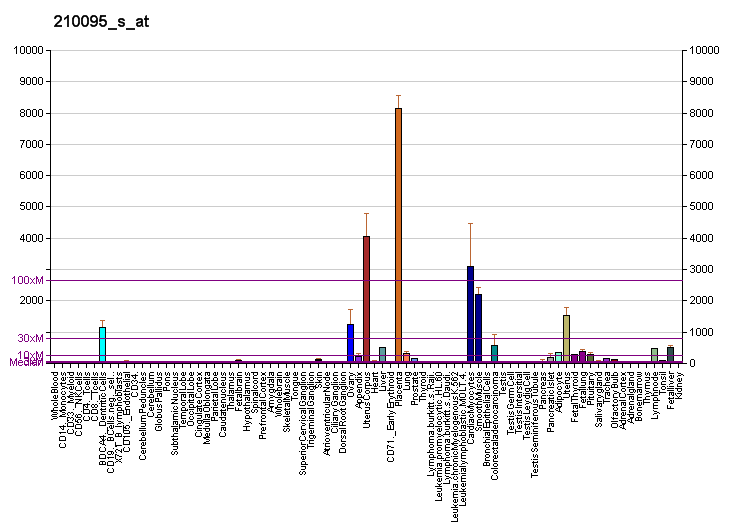
RNA expression pattern
Bgee	Human / Mouse (ortholog); Top expressed in: decidua; palpebral conjunctiva; cartilage tissue; Descending thoracic aorta; mucosa of urinary bladder; vulva; pericardium; skin of thigh; skin of hip; right lobe of liver / Top expressed in: Gonadal ridge; gastrula; molar; vestibular sensory epithelium; skin of external ear; external carotid artery; efferent ductule; right kidney; lip; human kidney; More reference expression data
BioGPS	More reference expression data
Gene ontology
Molecular function	fibronectin binding; insulin-like growth factor binding; protein tyrosine phosphatase activator activity; growth factor binding; insulin-like growth factor I binding; metal ion binding; insulin-like growth factor II binding; protein binding
Cellular component	insulin-like growth factor ternary complex; extracellular region; insulin-like growth factor binding protein complex; nucleus; extracellular space; endoplasmic reticulum lumen
Biological process	negative regulation of protein phosphorylation; negative regulation of smooth muscle cell proliferation; negative regulation of smooth muscle cell migration; protein phosphorylation; regulation of insulin-like growth factor receptor signaling pathway; regulation of glucose metabolic process; positive regulation of insulin-like growth factor receptor signaling pathway; positive regulation of myoblast differentiation; regulation of cell growth; osteoblast differentiation; positive regulation of apoptotic process; regulation of growth; negative regulation of signal transduction; type B pancreatic cell proliferation; positive regulation of MAPK cascade; negative regulation of cell population proliferation; apoptotic process; regulation of apoptotic process; post-translational protein modification; regulation of phosphoprotein phosphatase activity
Sources:Amigo / QuickGO
Orthologs
Databases	NCBI: entry; OMA: entry
Species	Human	Mouse
Entrez	3486	16009
Ensembl	ENSG00000146674	ENSMUSG00000020427
UniProt	P17936	P47878
RefSeq (mRNA)	NM_001013398; NM_000598	NM_008343
RefSeq (protein)	NP_000589; NP_001013416	NP_032369
Location (UCSC)	Chr 7: 45.91 – 45.92 Mb	Chr 11: 7.16 – 7.16 Mb
PubMed search
- Wikidata
View/Edit Human	View/Edit Mouse

Insulin-like growth factor-binding protein 3, also known as IGFBP-3, is a protein that in humans is encoded by the IGFBP3 gene. IGFBP-3 is one of six IGF binding proteins (IGFBP-1 to IGFBP-6) that have highly conserved structures and bind the insulin-like growth factors IGF-1 and IGF-2 with high affinity. IGFBP-7, sometimes included in this family, shares neither the conserved structural features nor the high IGF affinity. Instead, IGFBP-7 binds IGF1R, which blocks IGF-1 and IGF-2 binding, resulting in apoptosis.

== Gene ==
The IGFBP3 gene (or IBP3), on human chromosome 7, is organized into four protein-coding exons with a 5th exon in the 3' untranslated region. It is located adjacent to the IGFBP1 gene in tail-to-tail orientation, separated by 20 kb.

== Tissue distribution ==
IGFBP-3 mRNA is expressed in all tissue examined, with kidney, stomach, placenta, uterus and liver showing highest expression in rat tissues. Rat liver IGFBP-3 mRNA is found in nonparenchymal cells including sinusoidal endothelium, but not in hepatocytes. In contrast, human hepatocytes do express IGFBP-3.

== Structure ==
The encoded protein includes a 27-residue signal peptide followed by the 264-residue mature protein. IGFBP-3 shares with the other five high-affinity IGFBPs and a 3-domain structure:

1. A conserved N-terminal domain containing a cysteine rich region (12 cysteine residues) with multiple intra-domain disulfide bonds, an IGFBP motif (GCGCCXXC), the primary site of IGF binding.
2. A highly variable central or linker domain (only 15% conservation between IGFBPs).
3. A conserved C-terminal domain containing secondary IGF binding residues, a cysteine rich region (6 cysteine residues), an 18 residue basic motif that binds heparin, the acid labile subunit (ALS), and a nuclear localization sequence.

The linker domain is the site of most post-translational modification, which include glycosylation, phosphorylation, and limited proteolysis. By electrophoretic analysis IGFBP-3 appears as a doublet, owing to the occupancy of either two or three of its N-glycosylation sites by carbohydrate. Hypoglycosylated IGFBP-3 may be seen after extended glucose starvation.

Many proteases are known to cleave IGFBP-3 at single linker-domain sites, and in the circulation of pregnant women, IGFBP-3 is entirely proteolyzed, yet still capable of carrying normal amounts of IGF-1 and IGF-2. Binding capacity appears to be retained after proteolysis because of a cooperative interaction between the two proteolyzed fragments, that together maintain an active IGF-binding site.

== Function ==
IGFBP-3 was first isolated, characterized, and quantitated in human plasma, in 1986. It has well-documented functions in the circulation, in the extracellular environment, and inside cells. It is the main IGF transport protein in the bloodstream, where it carries the growth factors predominantly in stable complexes that contain the binding protein, either IGF-1 or IGF-2, and a third protein called the acid-labile subunit or ALS.

For IGFs to reach the tissues from the bloodstream, the circulating complexes are believed to partly dissociate, possibly enhanced by limited proteolysis of IGFBP-3. The IGF-1/IGFBP-3 ratio has sometimes been used as an index of IGF bioavailability in the human circulation, but this ignores IGF-1 binding to other IGFBPs (so the ratio is affected by the concentrations of all six IGFBPs), and the fact that IGF-2, which is three times more abundant than IGF-1 in the bloodstream of adults, occupies the majority of binding sites on circulating IGFBP-3.

Within tissues, IGFBP-3 can bind IGF-1 and IGF-2 released by many cell types, and block their access to the IGF-1 receptor (IGF1R), which is activated by both IGFs. IGFBP-3 also interacts with cell-surface proteins, affecting cell signaling from outside the cell or after internalization, and also enters the cell nucleus where it binds to nuclear hormone receptors and other ligands. High levels of IGFBP-3 within tumors are associated with increased cancer severity (or worse outcome) for some cancers, but decreased severity or better outcome for others. No cases of IGFBP3 gene deletion in humans have been reported, but mice lacking the gene show near-normal growth.

IGFBP-3 exerts antiproliferative effects in many cell types by blocking the ability of IGF-1 and IGF-2 to activate the IGF1R (which stimulates cell proliferation). For example, in esophageal epithelial cells, responsiveness to IGF-1 stimulation is suppressed by secreted IGFBP-3 and restored when IGFBP-3 is downregulated by epidermal growth factor. IGFBP-3 can also inhibit cell function by mechanisms that are independent of effects on IGF1R signaling, even in cells that entirely lack IGF1R. IGF (or IGF1R) independent effects are commonly studied using mutant forms of IGFBP-3 with decreased IGF binding affinity. Thus, IGFBP-3-induced apoptosis in differentiating chondrocyte precursor cells is seen equally with a non-IGF binding IGFBP-3 mutant, demonstrating that the mechanism does not involve IGF binding. IGF1R-independent growth inhibition by IGFBP-3 may involve the induction of pro-apoptotic proteins such as Bax and Bad and may be mediated by ceramides (pro-apoptotic lipids), or potentiate ceramide action IGFBP-3 interaction with nuclear hormone receptors may also lead to inhibition of cell proliferation.

Contrasting with the typical growth-inhibitory effects of IGFBP-3, stimulation of cell proliferation by IGFBP-3 has also been observed. This can occur either by enhancing IGF-stimulated proliferation or in the absence of IGF-1. In endothelial cells and mammary epithelial cells, the stimulatory effect of IGFBP-3 has been shown to involve activation of the enzyme sphingosine kinase, and generation of the bioactive lipid, sphingosine-1-phosphate, which promotes growth by transactivating the EGFR receptor.

== Regulation ==
IGFBP-3 levels in human serum are, like IGF-1, dependent on growth hormone (GH); for example, serum IGFBP-3 is increased in acromegaly and low in GH-deficient children. However, IGFBP-3 gene expression in human liver is GH-independent. Because it is stabilized in human serum by forming complexes with IGF-1 and ALS, which are both GH-dependent, serum IGFBP-3 also appears regulated by GH. Its production by some non-hepatic tissues may also be directly GH-regulated. Immunoassays for serum IGFBP-3 are often used as part of the diagnosis of childhood GH-deficiency.

The most widely studied IGFBP3 polymorphism, at nucleotide-202 in the promoter region, is significantly associated with circulating IGFBP-3 levels, although the mechanism is unclear. In some studies circulating IGFBP-3 also appears to be nutritionally regulated, although this may not be seen at the mRNA level. IGFBP-3 has been identified in human lymph, nipple aspirate, milk, amniotic fluid, follicular fluid, seminal plasma, urine, peritoneal dialysate, synovial fluid, tear fluid, and cerebrospinal fluid, in addition to serum.

Many factors increase IGFBP-3 production by cells, including transforming growth factor-β (TGFβ), tumor necrosis factor-α, vitamin D, retinoic acid, IGF-1, and stimuli such as chemotherapy that activate the tumor suppressor p53. Estrogen inhibits IGFBP-3 production, and its tissue levels are lower in estrogen receptor (ER)-positive breast cancers than in ER-negative cancers.

== Clinical significance ==
=== Cancer ===
Based on cell growth experiments, animal cancer models, and epidemiological studies, it appears that IGFBP-3 functions as a low-penetrance tumor suppressor gene.

Dysregulation of IGFBP-3 has been implicated in many cancers. Downregulation of its tissue expression by promoter hypermethylation in some cancers, such as hepatoma and non-small cell lung cancer may be associated with poor patient outcome. However, consistent with the dual inhibitory and stimulatory roles of IGFBP-3 seen in cell culture, there are other cancer types, such as breast cancer, pancreatic cancer, and clear cell renal cell cancer in which high tissue IGFBP-3 expression has been linked to poor prognostic features or patient outcome. The mechanisms regulating these contrasting effects of IGFBP-3 in vivo are not well understood.

Since IGFBP-3 is abundant in the bloodstream of healthy adults (typically 2–4 mg/L), and is largely stabilized by its complex formation with IGFs and ALS, it is unlikely that tumor-derived IGFBP-3 has a large influence on circulating levels. There have been many studies linking circulating IGFBP-3 levels to the presence, or risk, of various cancers, or to patient outcomes. but unequivocal conclusions have often been lacking. For example, high plasma IGFBP-3 levels were associated with a reduced prospective risk of colorectal cancer in women. but in a study including men and women, colon cancer risk was positively associated with plasma IGFBP-3, while there was no significant association for rectal cancer. A large systematic review concluded that circulating IGFBP-3 levels showed a modest association with increased risk for a number of cancers, but the results vary among sites.

IGFBP-3 protein levels decrease during the progression of prostate cancer from benign to metastatic disease although production of the protein does not cease completely. IGFBP-3 is still made (at a lower level) by prostate cancer cells and secreted into the surrounding environment. However, instead of the full length, functional protein, IGFBP-3 is found to be cleaved. This decreases the affinity of IGF binding to IGFBP-3, making the growth factors more likely to bind the IGF1R and promote cell survival.

=== Sepsis ===
IGFBP-3 has been implicated in the regulation of cell growth, immune response, and endothelial integrity. In patients with sepsis, reduced serum levels of IGFBP-3 have been associated with increased mortality and greater immune suppression. A 2025 prospective study on 139 patients with microbiologically confirmed sepsis found that baseline IGFBP-3 concentrations below 10.64 pg/mL were independently associated with higher 30-day (28% vs. 10%) and 1-year mortality (69% vs. 35%) compared to patients with higher levels. These patients also exhibited lower lymphocyte counts, increased interleukin-6 levels, and more frequent polymicrobial infections, suggesting a phenotype characterized by immunosuppression and gut barrier dysfunction. IGFBP-3 had an area under the ROC curve (AUROC) of 0.70 for predicting 1-year mortality, outperforming other biomarkers such as CRP, procalcitonin, IL-6, and lactate. When added to clinical models including age and SOFA score, IGFBP-3 significantly improved prognostic accuracy up to 365 days. Preclinical studies support its immunomodulatory and anti-apoptotic roles, and therapeutic strategies targeting the IGF-1/IGFBP-3 axis are under investigation.

== Interactions ==
The main IGFBP-3 ligands in the circulation are IGF-1 and IGF-2, and the acid-labile subunit (ALS). The serum proteins transferrin, fibronectin, and plasminogen are also known to bind IGFBP-3. In the cell and tissue environment many other interactions have been described (see Table). Two unrelated cell-surface proteins have been designated as IGFBP-3 receptors: low density lipoprotein receptor-related protein 1 (LRP1), also known as alpha-2-macroglobulin receptor or type V TGFβ receptor and the transmembrane protein TMEM219. Both are believed to mediate antiproliferative effects. Functional interactions with the EGF receptor and the type I/type II TGFβ receptor system have also been reported, and other cell-surface proteins such as proteoglycans also bind IGFBP-3. IGFBP-3 can enter cells by both clathrin-mediated and caveolin-mediated endocytosis. possibly involving the transferrin receptor.

IGFBP-3 enters the cell nucleus by a mechanism that is incompletely understood, but involves its binding to importin-β. Within the nucleus, it can modulate nuclear hormone receptor activity by direct binding to retinoid X receptor, retinoic acid receptor, vitamin D receptor, PPARγ, and nur77, IGFBP-3 also interacts with DNA-dependent protein kinase within the nucleus to promote the repair of DNA damage.

IGFBP3 has been shown to interact with:

- ADAM12
- ADAM28
- COL1A1
- FN1
- IGFALS
- IGF1,
- IGF2
- HSPA5
- Humanin
- PLG
- RXRA
- TF
- KPNB1
- PRKDC
- EGFR
- LTBP1

== See also ==
- Mecasermin rinfabate, Recombinant IGF-1 with IGFBP-3 used for a variety of indications.
