= Ring finger protein 103 =

Protein-coding gene in the species Homo sapiens

RNF103

Identifiers
- Aliases: RNF103, HKF-1, KF-1, KF1, ZFP-103, ZFP103, ring finger protein 103
- External IDs: OMIM: 602507; MGI: 109483; GeneCards: RNF103
Enzyme activity
EC #	BRENDA	ExPASy	KEGG	MetaCyc
2.3.2.27	↗	↗	↗	↗

Gene location (Human)
Chr.	Chromosome 2 (human)
Band	2p11.2	Start	86,603,398 bp
Band	2p11.2	End	86,623,866 bp

Gene location (Mouse)
Chr.	Chromosome 6 (mouse)
Band	6 C1|6 32.16 cM	Start	71,470,878 bp
Band	6 C1|6 32.16 cM	End	71,487,865 bp
RNA expression pattern
Bgee	Human / Mouse (ortholog); Top expressed in: middle temporal gyrus; amniotic fluid; corpus epididymis; jejunal mucosa; Brodmann area 23; mucosa of ileum; germinal epithelium; trigeminal ganglion; corpus callosum; paraflocculus of cerebellum / Top expressed in: left colon; ciliary body; conjunctival fornix; seminal vesicula; substantia nigra; lacrimal gland; parotid gland; lobe of prostate; stroma of bone marrow; Paneth cell; More reference expression data
BioGPS	n/a
Gene ontology
Molecular function	protein binding; metal ion binding; ubiquitin-protein transferase activity; transferase activity; ubiquitin protein ligase activity
Cellular component	integral component of membrane; endoplasmic reticulum; membrane; endoplasmic reticulum membrane; endoplasmic reticulum quality control compartment
Biological process	central nervous system development; protein ubiquitination; ubiquitin-dependent ERAD pathway; endoplasmic reticulum mannose trimming
Sources:Amigo / QuickGO
Orthologs
Databases	NCBI: entry; OMA: entry
Species	Human	Mouse
Entrez	7844	22644
Ensembl	ENSG00000239305	ENSMUSG00000052656
UniProt	O00237	Q9R1W3
RefSeq (mRNA)	NM_005667; NM_001198951; NM_001198952	NM_009543; NM_001308303
RefSeq (protein)	NP_001185880; NP_001185881; NP_005658	NP_001295232; NP_033569
Location (UCSC)	Chr 2: 86.6 – 86.62 Mb	Chr 6: 71.47 – 71.49 Mb
PubMed search
- Wikidata
View/Edit Human	View/Edit Mouse

Ring finger protein 103 is a protein that in humans is encoded by the RNF103 gene.

== Function ==
The protein encoded by this gene contains a RING-H2 finger, a motif known to be involved in protein-protein and protein-DNA interactions. This gene is highly expressed in normal cerebellum, but not in the cerebral cortex. The expression of the rat counterpart in the frontal cortex and hippocampus was shown to be induced by electroconvulsive treatment (ECT) as well as chronic antidepressant treatment, suggesting that this gene may be a molecular target for ECT and antidepressants. The protein is a ubiquitin ligase that functions in the endoplasmic reticulum-associated degradation pathway. Alternative splicing of this gene results in multiple transcript variants. Read-through transcription also exists between this gene and the downstream CHMP3 (charged multivesicular body protein 3) gene.
