= RNA binding motif protein 44 =

Protein-coding gene in the species Homo sapiens

RBM44

Identifiers
- Aliases: RBM44, RNA binding motif protein 44
- External IDs: MGI: 2685663; GeneCards: RBM44

Gene location (Human)
Chr.	Chromosome 2 (human)
Band	2q37.3	Start	237,798,389 bp
Band	2q37.3	End	237,842,808 bp

Gene location (Mouse)
Chr.	Chromosome 1 (mouse)
Band	1|1 D	Start	91,072,811 bp
Band	1|1 D	End	91,098,517 bp
RNA expression pattern
Bgee	Human / Mouse (ortholog); Top expressed in: testicle; right testis; left testis; gonad; monocyte; Achilles tendon; bone marrow; tibial arteries; thoracic aorta; ascending aorta / Top expressed in: spermatocyte; spermatid; seminiferous tubule; secondary oocyte; zygote; primary oocyte; blastocyst; embryo; morula; embryo; More reference expression data
BioGPS	n/a
Orthologs
Databases	NCBI: entry; OMA: entry
Species	Human	Mouse
Entrez	375316	329207
Ensembl	ENSG00000177483	ENSMUSG00000070732
UniProt	Q6ZP01	Q3V089
RefSeq (mRNA)	NM_001080504; NM_198852	NM_001033408
RefSeq (protein)	NP_001073973	NP_001028580
Location (UCSC)	Chr 2: 237.8 – 237.84 Mb	Chr 1: 91.07 – 91.1 Mb
PubMed search
- Wikidata
View/Edit Human	View/Edit Mouse

RNA binding motif protein 44 is a protein that in humans is encoded by the RBM44 gene.
