= IGFALS =

Protein-coding gene in the species Homo sapiens

Identifiers
- Aliases: IGFALS, ALS, ACLSD, insulin like growth factor binding protein acid labile subunit
- External IDs: OMIM: 601489; MGI: 107973; HomoloGene: 37987; GeneCards: IGFALS; OMA:IGFALS - orthologs

Gene location (Human)
Chr.	Chromosome 16 (human)
Band	16p13.3	Start	1,790,413 bp
Band	16p13.3	End	1,794,971 bp

Gene location (Mouse)
Chr.	Chromosome 17 (mouse)
Band	17 A3.3|17 12.53 cM	Start	25,084,971 bp
Band	17 A3.3|17 12.53 cM	End	25,100,984 bp
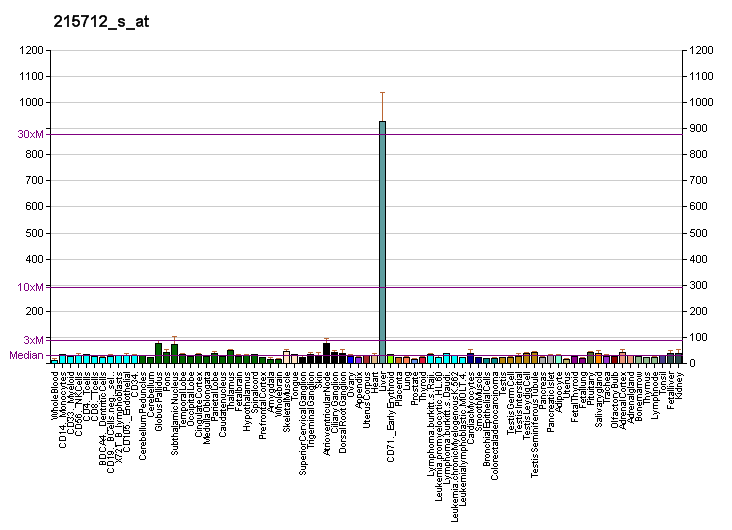
RNA expression pattern
Bgee	Human / Mouse (ortholog); Top expressed in: right lobe of liver; parotid gland; inferior olivary nucleus; dorsal motor nucleus of vagus nerve; Skeletal muscle tissue of biceps brachii; cardia; body of stomach; fundus; pericardium; middle temporal gyrus / Top expressed in: lactiferous gland; left lobe of liver; right kidney; islet of Langerhans; yolk sac; proximal tubule; white adipose tissue; embryo; embryo; subcutaneous adipose tissue; More reference expression data
BioGPS	More reference expression data
Gene ontology
Molecular function	insulin-like growth factor binding
Cellular component	extracellular region; insulin-like growth factor ternary complex; extracellular exosome; nucleoplasm; extracellular space; extracellular matrix
Biological process	cell adhesion; signal transduction
Sources:Amigo / QuickGO
Orthologs
Species	Human	Mouse
Entrez	3483	16005
Ensembl	ENSG00000099769	ENSMUSG00000046070
UniProt	P35858	P70389
RefSeq (mRNA)	NM_001146006; NM_004970	NM_008340; NM_001364895; NM_001364896
RefSeq (protein)	NP_001139478; NP_004961	NP_032366; NP_001351824; NP_001351825
Location (UCSC)	Chr 16: 1.79 – 1.79 Mb	Chr 17: 25.08 – 25.1 Mb
PubMed search
- Wikidata
View/Edit Human	View/Edit Mouse

Insulin-like growth factor binding protein, acid labile subunit, also known as IGFALS, is a protein which in humans is encoded by the IGFALS gene.

== Function ==
The protein encoded by this gene is a serum protein that binds insulin-like growth factors, increasing their half-life and their vascular localization. Production of the encoded protein, which contains twenty leucine-rich repeats, is stimulated by growth hormone. Three transcript variants encoding two different isoforms have been found for this gene.

== Clinical significance ==
Defects in this gene are a cause of acid-labile subunit deficiency, which manifests itself in a delayed and slow puberty.

== Interactions ==
IGFALS has been shown to interact with IGFBP3.
