= CCDC116 =

Protein-coding gene in humans

Identifiers
- Aliases: CCDC116, coiled-coil domain containing 116
- External IDs: MGI: 1924122; GeneCards: CCDC116

Gene location (Human)
Chr.	Chromosome 22 (human)
Band	22q11.21	Start	21,632,716 bp
Band	22q11.21	End	21,637,329 bp

Gene location (Mouse)
Chr.	Chromosome 16 (mouse)
Band	16|16 A3	Start	16,956,928 bp
Band	16|16 A3	End	16,965,093 bp
RNA expression pattern
Bgee	Human / Mouse (ortholog); Top expressed in: left testis; testicle; right testis; sperm; popliteal artery; tibial arteries; left coronary artery; stromal cell of endometrium; thoracic aorta; ascending aorta / Top expressed in: spermatid; seminiferous tubule; spermatocyte; embryo; granulocyte; primary visual cortex; superior frontal gyrus; epiblast; morula; dentate gyrus of hippocampal formation granule cell; More reference expression data
BioGPS	n/a
Orthologs
Databases	NCBI: entry; OMA: entry
Species	Human	Mouse
Entrez	164592	76872
Ensembl	ENSG00000161180	ENSMUSG00000022768
UniProt	Q8IYX3	Q80X53
RefSeq (mRNA)	NM_152612; NM_001331066	NM_001164606; NM_029779; NM_001306169; NM_001373948
RefSeq (protein)	NP_001317995; NP_689825	NP_001293098; NP_084055
Location (UCSC)	Chr 22: 21.63 – 21.64 Mb	Chr 16: 16.96 – 16.97 Mb
PubMed search
- Wikidata
View/Edit Human	View/Edit Mouse

Coiled-coil domain-containing protein 116 is a protein that in humans is encoded by the gene CCDC116.

== Gene ==
CCDC116 has no aliases. This gene is 2252 base pairs long. CCDC116 has 5 exons and is located on chromosome 22q11.21 on the plus strand.

== mRNA ==
CCDC116 has two isoforms. The isoforms differ in the 3’ UTR and coding sequence.

== Protein ==
CCDC116 is 612 amino acids long. CCDC116 is 67.9 kdal. This protein has an isoelectric point of 9.24. This protein is a part of the domain of unknown function 4702.

It is predicted that CCDC116 is located in the nucleus. It is predicted that the membrane typology of this protein is a type 3a rolled up beta sheet. This protein has mostly alpha helices with a few coils.

== Expression ==
CCDC116 is primarily found in the testis, although this gene is found in very small amounts in the brain and connective tissue. There are two SNPs that are upstream variants, one that is a downstream variant, one that is an intron variant.

== Regulation of Expression ==
CCDC116 has four promoter regions and eight primary transcripts. Two promoter regions located on the + strand, and two located on the - strand.

== Function Protein Partners ==
CCDC116 has two predicted function partners. NGFRAP is a nerve growth factor receptor associated protein. This gene is believed to play a role in the pathogenesis of neurogenetic diseases, although that claim has not been proven.

== Clinical Significance ==
There has yet to be any disease association with CCDC116, but currently there is a patent for this gene with the potential for it to be related to cancer. A study was done in 2012 on observing how this gene is expressed in human pancreatic islets and in endocrine pancreatic tumors.
