= SHC binding and spindle associated 1 like =

Protein found in humans

SHCBP1L

Identifiers
- Aliases: SHCBP1L, C1orf14, GE36, SHC binding and spindle associated 1 like
- External IDs: MGI: 1919086; GeneCards: SHCBP1L

Gene location (Human)
Chr.	Chromosome 1 (human)
Band	1q25.3	Start	182,899,865 bp
Band	1q25.3	End	182,953,525 bp

Gene location (Mouse)
Chr.	Chromosome 1 (mouse)
Band	1|1 G3	Start	153,300,908 bp
Band	1|1 G3	End	153,328,320 bp
RNA expression pattern
Bgee	Human / Mouse (ortholog); Top expressed in: sperm; right testis; left testis; testicle; gastric mucosa; apex of heart; embryo; ventricular zone; ganglionic eminence; human musculoskeletal system / Top expressed in: spermatocyte; spermatid; seminiferous tubule; otolith organ; utricle; secondary oocyte; primary oocyte; zygote; Gonadal ridge; substantia nigra; More reference expression data
BioGPS	n/a
Orthologs
Databases	NCBI: entry; OMA: entry
Species	Human	Mouse
Entrez	81626	71836
Ensembl	ENSG00000157060	ENSMUSG00000042708
UniProt	Q9BZQ2	Q3TTP0
RefSeq (mRNA)	NM_030933; NM_001345928	NM_001033162
RefSeq (protein)	NP_001332857; NP_112195	NP_001028334
Location (UCSC)	Chr 1: 182.9 – 182.95 Mb	Chr 1: 153.3 – 153.33 Mb
PubMed search
- Wikidata
View/Edit Human	View/Edit Mouse

SHC binding and spindle associated 1 like is a protein that in humans is encoded by the SHCBP1L gene.

== Function ==
This gene encodes a Src homology 2 domain-binding protein 1-like protein. The encoded protein interacts with heat shock 70 kDa protein 2 and may be involved in maintaining spindle integrity during meiosis. This gene is located in region of chromoso0me 1 encompassing a prostate cancer susceptibility locus. [provided by RefSeq, Sep 2016].
