= TMEM219 =

Protein-coding gene in the species Homo sapiens

Identifiers
- Aliases: TMEM219, IGFBP-3R, transmembrane protein 219
- External IDs: MGI: 1915992; HomoloGene: 19263; GeneCards: TMEM219; OMA:TMEM219 - orthologs

Gene location (Human)
Chr.	Chromosome 16 (human)
Band	16p11.2	Start	29,940,885 bp
Band	16p11.2	End	29,973,050 bp

Gene location (Mouse)
Chr.	Chromosome 7 (mouse)
Band	7|7 F3	Start	126,485,343 bp
Band	7|7 F3	End	126,522,089 bp
RNA expression pattern
Bgee	Human / Mouse (ortholog); Top expressed in: right testis; left testis; right uterine tube; C1 segment; mucosa of transverse colon; apex of heart; body of stomach; right adrenal cortex; mucosa of ileum; body of pancreas / Top expressed in: lacrimal gland; granulocyte; ascending aorta; Paneth cell; right kidney; aortic valve; spermatocyte; proximal tubule; seminal vesicula; left lobe of liver; More reference expression data
BioGPS	n/a
Gene ontology
Molecular function	protein binding
Cellular component	membrane; integral component of membrane; plasma membrane
Biological process	apoptotic process; regulation of apoptotic process
Sources:Amigo / QuickGO
Orthologs
Species	Human	Mouse
Entrez	124446	68742
Ensembl	ENSG00000149932	ENSMUSG00000060538
UniProt	Q86XT9	Q9D123
RefSeq (mRNA)	NM_001083613; NM_194280	NM_026827; NM_028389; NM_001374613
RefSeq (protein)	NP_001077082; NP_919256; NP_001356617; NP_001356618; NP_001356619	NP_081103; NP_082665; NP_001361542
Location (UCSC)	Chr 16: 29.94 – 29.97 Mb	Chr 7: 126.49 – 126.52 Mb
PubMed search
- Wikidata
View/Edit Human	View/Edit Mouse

Transmembrane protein 219 also known as insulin-like growth factor-binding protein 3 receptor or IGFBP-3R is a protein that in humans is encoded by the TMEM219 gene. IGFBP-3R acts as a cell death receptor for IGFBP3.
