= CHMP3 =

Protein-coding gene in humans

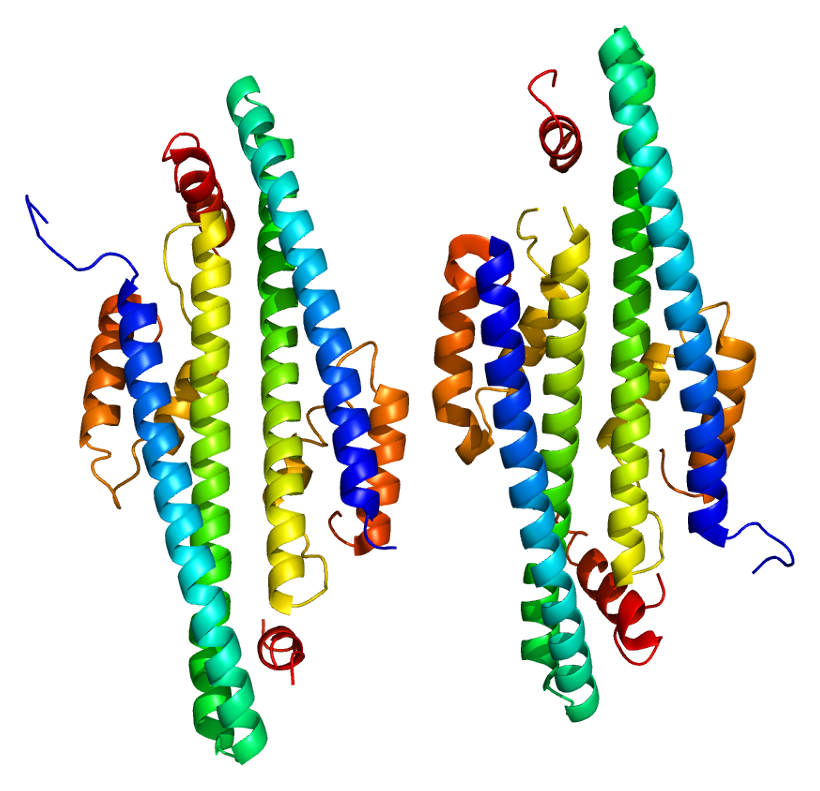

Identifiers
- Aliases: CHMP3, NEDF, VPS24, CGI-149, charged multivesicular body protein 3
- External IDs: OMIM: 610052; MGI: 1913950; GeneCards: CHMP3
Available structures
PDB	Ortholog search: PDBe RCSB
PDB	List of PDB id codes 2XZE, 3FRT, 3FRV, 2GD5

Gene location (Human)
Chr.	Chromosome 2 (human)
Band	2p11.2	Start	86,503,430 bp
Band	2p11.2	End	86,563,479 bp

Gene location (Mouse)
Chr.	Chromosome 6 (mouse)
Band	6 C1|6 32.17 cM	Start	71,520,781 bp
Band	6 C1|6 32.17 cM	End	71,559,593 bp
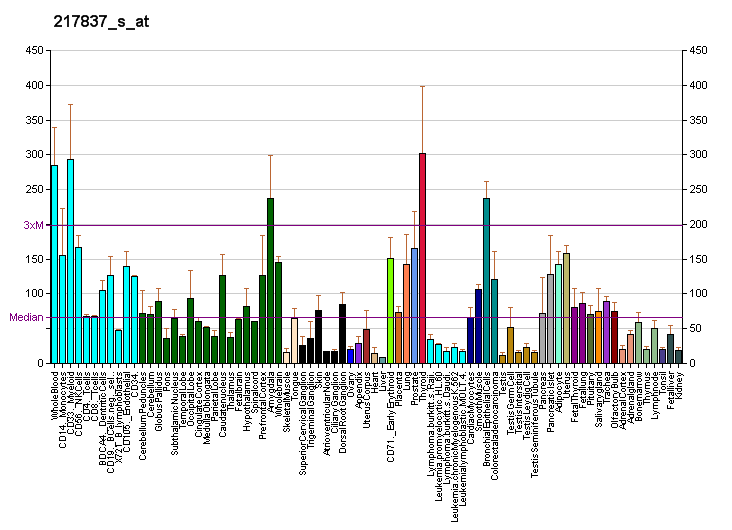
RNA expression pattern
Bgee	Human / Mouse (ortholog); Top expressed in: Achilles tendon; secondary oocyte; cerebellar vermis; nipple; skin of hip; urethra; saphenous vein; parotid gland; rectum; trabecular bone / Top expressed in: granulocyte; dentate gyrus of hippocampal formation granule cell; seminal vesicula; neural layer of retina; superior frontal gyrus; right kidney; spermatocyte; lip; muscle of thigh; esophagus; More reference expression data
BioGPS	More reference expression data
Gene ontology
Molecular function	protein binding; phosphatidylcholine binding; protein homodimerization activity; ubiquitin-specific protease binding; identical protein binding
Cellular component	cytoplasm; membrane; plasma membrane; endosome; late endosome membrane; extracellular exosome; ESCRT III complex; cytosol; intracellular anatomical structure; late endosome; cytoplasmic vesicle; multivesicular body
Biological process	autophagosome maturation; viral life cycle; protein polymerization; multivesicular body assembly; cell cycle; cell division; regulation of mitotic spindle assembly; endosomal transport; regulation of centrosome duplication; apoptotic process; protein heterooligomerization; vacuolar transport; septum digestion after cytokinesis; protein transport; nucleus organization; mitotic metaphase plate congression; multivesicular body sorting pathway; regulation of exosomal secretion; macroautophagy; multivesicular body-lysosome fusion; regulation of early endosome to late endosome transport; transport; viral budding via host ESCRT complex; endosome transport via multivesicular body sorting pathway; late endosome to vacuole transport; midbody abscission
Sources:Amigo / QuickGO
Orthologs
Databases	NCBI: entry; OMA: entry
Species	Human	Mouse
Entrez	51652	66700
Ensembl	ENSG00000115561	ENSMUSG00000053119
UniProt	Q9Y3E7	Q9CQ10
RefSeq (mRNA)	NM_001005753; NM_001193517; NM_016079	NM_025783; NM_001355674; NM_001355675; NM_001361405
RefSeq (protein)	NP_001005753; NP_001180446; NP_057163	NP_080059; NP_001342603; NP_001342604; NP_001348334
Location (UCSC)	Chr 2: 86.5 – 86.56 Mb	Chr 6: 71.52 – 71.56 Mb
PubMed search
- Wikidata
View/Edit Human	View/Edit Mouse

Charged multivesicular body protein 3 is a protein that in humans is encoded by the CHMP3 gene (previously VPS24).

== Function ==
This gene encodes a protein that acts in the sorting of transmembrane proteins into lysosomes/vacuoles via the multivesicular body (MVB) pathway. This protein, along with other soluble coiled-coil containing proteins, forms part of the ESCRT-III protein complex that binds to the endosomal membrane and recruits additional cofactors for protein sorting into the MVB. This protein may also co-immunoprecipitate with a member of the IFG-binding protein superfamily. Alternative splicing results in multiple transcript variants encoding different isoforms.

== Interactions ==
VPS24 has been shown to interact with IGFBP7.
