= IGFBP7 =

Protein-coding gene in the species Homo sapiens

Identifiers
- Aliases: IGFBP7, AGM, FSTL2, IBP-7, IGFBP-7, IGFBP-7v, IGFBPRP1, MAC25, PSF, RAMSVPS, TAF, insulin like growth factor binding protein 7
- External IDs: OMIM: 602867; MGI: 1352480; GeneCards: IGFBP7

Gene location (Human)
Chr.	Chromosome 4 (human)
Band	4q12	Start	57,030,773 bp
Band	4q12	End	57,110,385 bp

Gene location (Mouse)
Chr.	Chromosome 5 (mouse)
Band	5|5 C3.3	Start	77,497,087 bp
Band	5|5 C3.3	End	77,555,888 bp
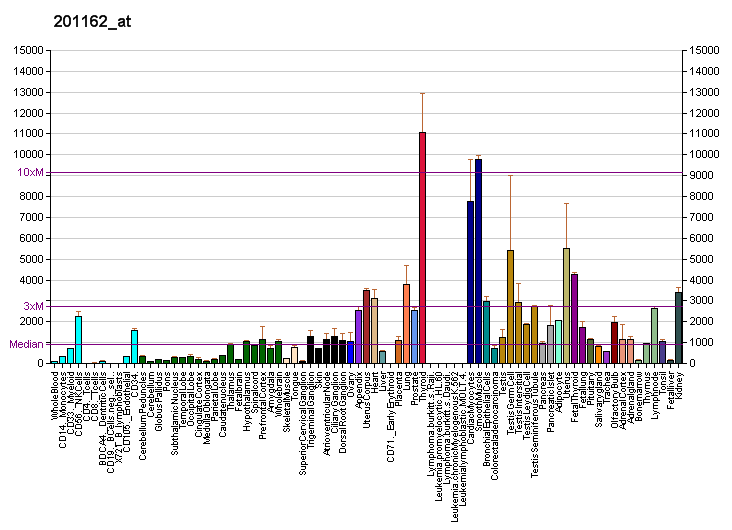

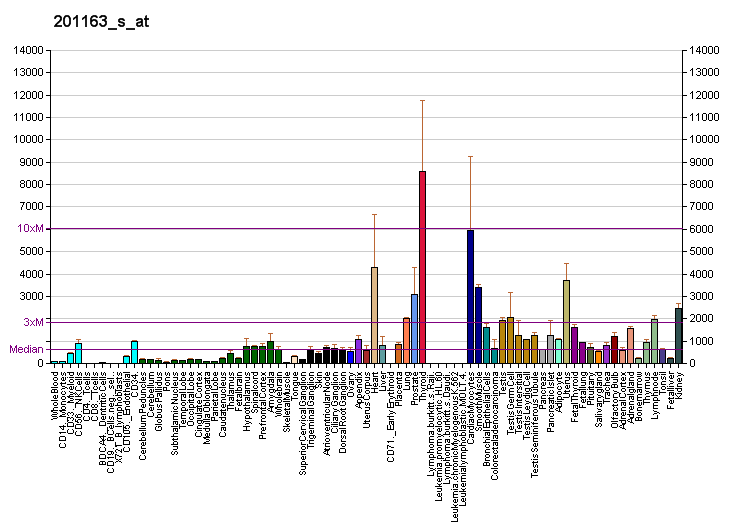
RNA expression pattern
Bgee	Human / Mouse (ortholog); Top expressed in: vena cava; renal medulla; saphenous vein; Epithelium of choroid plexus; pericardium; superficial temporal artery; Descending thoracic aorta; right coronary artery; urethra; ascending aorta / Top expressed in: ascending aorta; aortic valve; epithelium of lens; right kidney; tunica media of zone of aorta; proximal tubule; renal corpuscle; carotid body; right lung; mesenteric lymph nodes; More reference expression data
BioGPS	More reference expression data
Gene ontology
Molecular function	protein binding; growth factor binding; insulin-like growth factor binding; extracellular matrix structural constituent
Cellular component	extracellular matrix; extracellular exosome; extracellular space; endoplasmic reticulum lumen; extracellular region; collagen-containing extracellular matrix
Biological process	regulation of cell growth; negative regulation of cell population proliferation; cell adhesion; response to retinoic acid; cellular response to hormone stimulus; regulation of steroid biosynthetic process; response to heat; embryo implantation; response to organic cyclic compound; response to cortisol; post-translational protein modification
Sources:Amigo / QuickGO
Orthologs
Databases	NCBI: entry; OMA: entry
Species	Human	Mouse
Entrez	3490	29817
Ensembl	ENSG00000163453	ENSMUSG00000036256
UniProt	Q16270	Q61581
RefSeq (mRNA)	NM_001553; NM_001253835	NM_001159518; NM_008048
RefSeq (protein)	NP_001240764; NP_001544	NP_001152990; NP_032074
Location (UCSC)	Chr 4: 57.03 – 57.11 Mb	Chr 5: 77.5 – 77.56 Mb
PubMed search
- Wikidata
View/Edit Human	View/Edit Mouse

Insulin-like growth factor-binding protein 7 is a protein that in humans is encoded by the IGFBP7 gene. The major function of the protein is the regulation of availability of insulin-like growth factors (IGFs) in tissue as well as in modulating IGF binding to its receptors. IGFBP7 binds to IGF with low affinity compared to IGFBPs 1-6. It also stimulates cell adhesion. The protein is implicated in some cancers.

== Structure ==
The edited sites are found within the insulin growth factor binding domain of IGFBP7 and also Heparin binding domain. This region is also a site for proteolytic cleavage. Structural analysis of the edited sites determined that the two amino acids that corresponded to the edited sites are not directly involved in binding to IGF-1 but are found in regions flanking them. At position 78 in unedited version of the transcript there is an Arginine close to residue valine-49. This Valine is important in hydrophobic interaction of Phenylalanine of IGF-1. A substitution to a Glycine at this position is thought to introduce additional flexibility leading to a change of loop conformation, thereby disrupting the hydrophobic interaction that stabilises the complex. At amino acid position 98 the unedited transcript contains a lysine. This residue makes some non specific interactions via the aliphatic part of the side chain with Glu-38 of IGF-1. In the edited version the position is an arginine. The long side chain of which is thought to be able to maintain these weak interactions.

== Function ==
The edited region contains a proposed heparin binding site and is also part of the recognition sequence for proteolytic cleavage. Heparin binding inhibits cell binding and cell adhesion functions of the protein. Cleavage which occurs at amino acid position 97 reduces heparin binding but modulates the growth stimulatory activity of the protein. Since the editing site occurs within this proposed heparin binding region the effects of editing may have implications for heparin binding and proteolytic cleavage and therefore have other affects downstream. Since the protein has been implicated in these processes it is believed editing might effect apoptosis, regulation of cell growth and angiogenesis.

=== Learning and memory ===
A study at the European Neuroscience Institute-Goettingen (Germany) found that fear extinction-induced IGF2/IGFBP7 signalling promotes the survival of 17- to 19-day-old newborn hippocampal neurons. This suggests that therapeutic strategies that enhance IGF2 signalling and adult neurogenesis might be suitable to treat diseases linked to excessive fear memory such as PTSD. The same group has found that IGFBP7 levels are increased in Alzheimer's disease and regulated via DNA methylation. Elevation of IGFBP7 in wild type mice causes memory impairment. Blocking IGFBP7 function in mice that develop Alzheimer's disease-like memory impairment restores memory function. These data suggest that IGFBP7 is a critical regulator of memory consolidation and might be used as biomarker for Alzheimer's disease. Targeting IGFBP7 could be a novel therapeutic avenue for the treatment of Alzheimer's disease patients.

== RNA editing ==
The pre-mRNA of this protein is subject to RNA editing. The two editing sites were previously recorded as single nucleotide polymorphisms in dbSNP.

=== Types ===
A to I RNA editing is catalyzed by a family of adenosine deaminases acting on RNA (ADARs) that specifically recognize adenosines within double-stranded regions of pre-mRNAs and deaminate them to inosine. Inosines are recognised as guanosine by the cell's translational machinery. There are three members of the ADAR family ADARs 1-3 with ADAR 1 and ADAR 2 being the only enzymatically active members. ADAR3 is thought to have a regulatory role in the brain. ADAR1 and ADAR 2 are widely expressed in tissues while ADAR 3 is restricted to the brain. The double stranded regions of RNA are formed by base-pairing between residues in the close to region of the editing site with residues usually in a neighboring intron but can be an exonic sequence. The region that base pairs with the editing region is known as an Editing Complentary Sequence (ECS). It is thought that the pre-mRNA of IGFBP7 is a substrate for ADAR1 based on the expression spectrum of the editing enzyme.

=== Sites ===
The pre-mRNA of this protein is edited at two positions. These editing sites occur within the insulin growth factor domain.

==== R/G ====
There is an Arginine (R) to a Glycine (G) substitution at amino acid position 78 of the final protein.

==== K/R ====
There is a K to R substitution at amino acid position 95.

The editing complementary sequence (ECS) is located in a region within the coding sequence about 200 base pairs upstream from the editing sites. The ECS forms 140 bp duplex structure. The A to G discrepancies for these two editing sites were confirmed experimentally to be RNA editing by analyzing matched cDNA and genomic dna sequences from the same tissue sample. Intriguingly, those RNAs that do not need an intron sequence to pair with could, in theory, continue to undergo editing as mature mRNA. A third candidate editing site did not show evidence of RNA editing in sequence analysis, which may be an indication that either the RNA editing process is tissue specific, or editing occurs at a low frequency. One other possible explanation is that these edits are related to specific genomic polymorphisms. The editing site also overlaps with an antisense transcript which could also form a double stranded RNA structure creating a suitable substrate for ADARs.

=== Regulation ===
Editing is observed in a wide range of tissues. Editing at the K/R site at amino acid position 95 is very high in the human brain.

== Interactions ==
IGFBP7 has been shown to interact with Insulin-like growth factor 1, CHMP3, and the IGF-1 receptor (IGF1R).
