= Sense strand =

Coding strand of DNA

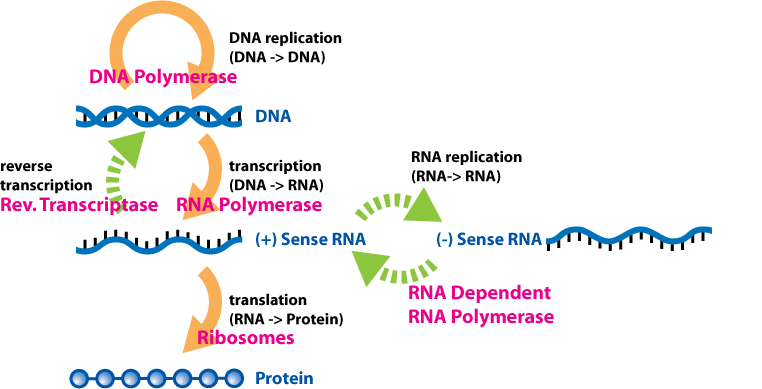

In genetics, a sense strand, or coding strand, is the segment within double-stranded DNA that carries the translatable code in the 5′ to 3′ direction, and which is complementary to the antisense strand of DNA, or template strand, which does not carry the translatable code in the 5′ to 3′ direction. The sense strand is the strand of DNA that has the same sequence as the mRNA, which takes the antisense strand as its template during transcription, and eventually undergoes (typically, not always) translation into a protein. The antisense strand is thus responsible for the RNA that is later translated to protein, while the sense strand possesses a nearly identical makeup to that of the mRNA.

== mRNA and "sense" ==
Note that for each segment of double-stranded DNA, there will possibly be two sets of sense and antisense, depending on which direction one reads (since sense and antisense is relative to perspective). It is ultimately the gene product, or mRNA, that dictates which strand of one segment of dsDNA we call sense or antisense. But keep in mind that sometimes, such as in prokaryotes, overlapping genes on opposite strands means the sense for one mRNA can be the antisense for another mRNA.

The immediate product of this transcription is a resultant initial RNA transcript, which contains a sequence of nucleotides that is identical to that of the sense strand. The exception to this is that uracil is used for nucleotide sequencing of RNA molecules rather than thymine.

Most eukaryotic RNA transcripts undergo additional editing prior to being translated for protein synthesis. This process typically involves the addition of a methylated guanine nucleotide cap at the 5' end, the addition of a poly-A tail at the 3' end, and the removal of introns from the initial RNA transcript (RNA splicing). The end product is known as a mature mRNA. Prokaryotic mRNA does not undergo the same process.

Strictly speaking, only the mRNA makes "sense" with the genetic code, as the translated protein peptide sequence can be directly inferred from this strand. The "antisense" strand of DNA is complementary to the "sense" strand and is the actual template for mRNA synthesis.

== Application ==
Knowing the difference between the sense and antisense strands is important in certain molecular biology applications. For example, in microarray expression technologies, it is important to know which strand is "viewed" on the array. An array can correspond to either strand; however, a single array will be made entirely of "sense" or "antisense" strands.

Identifying the different strands is also important in understanding small interfering RNAs, or siRNA.

== See also ==
- Sense (molecular biology)
