= HGH-hPL =

The multigenic complex formed by the human growth hormone (hGH) and the human placental lactogen (hPL) takes part in the process of maternal and fetal metabolism regulation and the following growth and development of the fetus.

== Evolution ==
It is thought that from a gene duplication of an ancestral predecessor of the hGH, hPL was created. This procedure is related with the high homological similarity (approximately 95% similarity in mRNA's coding regions) between these two genes creating the hGH-hPL multigene family. Even though the genes have lots of similarities in their structures, they are expressed in different tissues. Later mutations in both genes sequence of nucleotides explain these differences among the GH group and the PL.

Evolution of hGH-hPL multigene family

== Structure and location ==
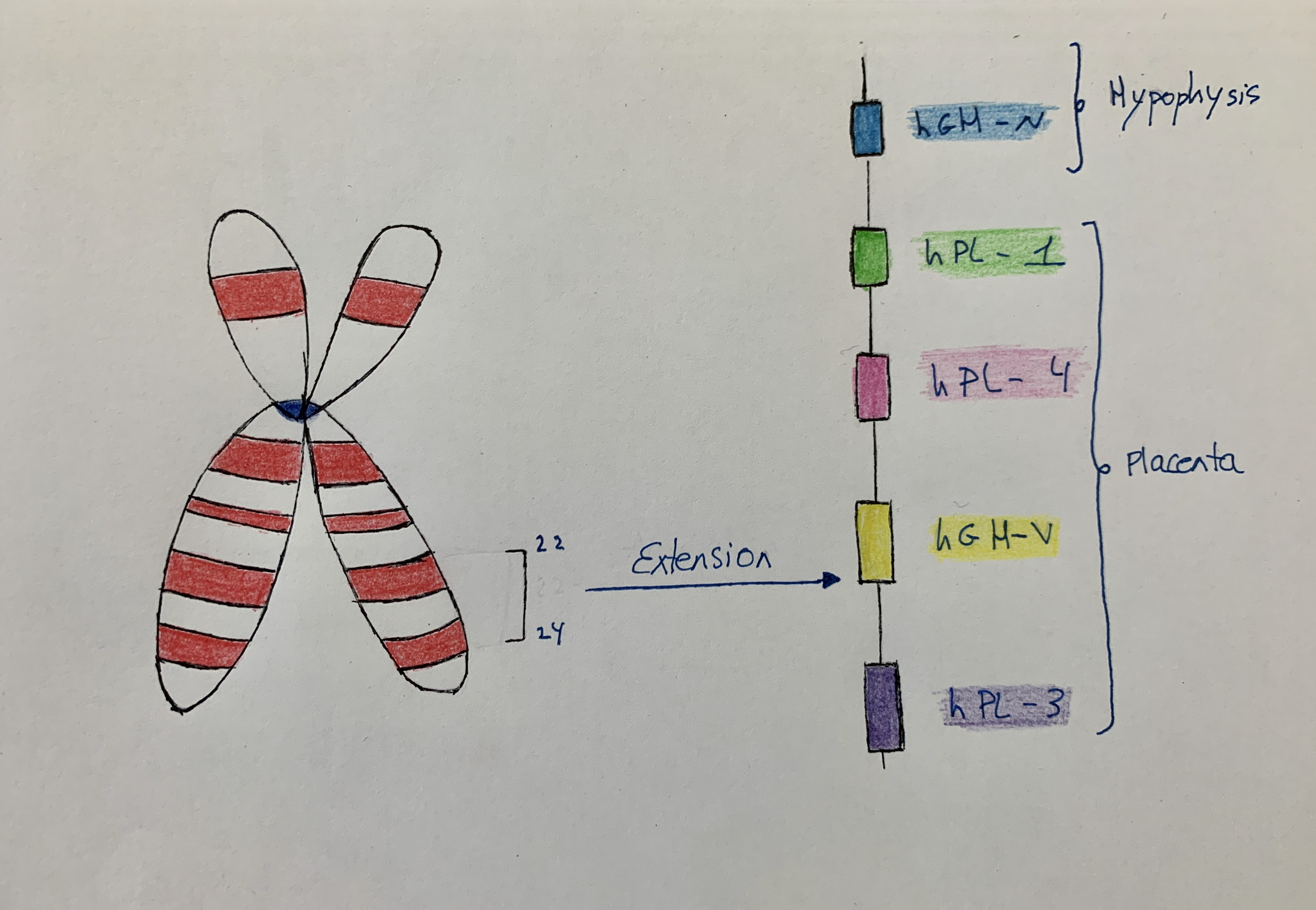
Structure and location

The hGH-hPL multigene family is located in the 17th chromosome, concretely between the q22 and q24 regions occupying an approximately 50.000 pairs of nitrogen bases area. It is formed by 5 genes: two hGH and three hPL with a similarity between 91% and 95%:

- hGH-N: expressed in the pituitary gland somatotroph. It is the only one from this multigene family expressed in the hypophysis.
- hGH-V: expressed in low levels in the placenta. It codifies for a GH variety.
- hPL-1: pseudogene also found in the placenta that contains a mutation which avoids its removal.
- hPL-3 and hPL-4: found in the placenta. They codify for a lactogenic hormone also found in the placenta.

The similarity of this five genes is shown in their function, as it has been exposed previously, but also in their structure. Each of them is formed by 5 exons and 4 introns. Their length is also very similar. Moreover, the three hPL genes, which are all found in the placenta, contain an enhancer sequence (DNA sequence that increases the transcription levels in gene family).

Regarding the intergenic space, this has a length between 6000 and 13000 pb (1pb, picobarn = 10^{−36} cm^{2}). This space is filled with a series of intergenic sequences repeated along the complex. The function of this sequences has not been clearly defined yet.

== Function ==
It has been demonstrated that hGH-hPL multigene interacts with different hormones during pregnancy and produces different proteic products which are secreted in the maternal and fetal circulations. This interaction starts in the 6th week of pregnancy and it has an important influence on the fetus growth. In the pregnant woman it increases its insulin-like growth factor (IGF) sintesys which regulates the fetus metabolism, stimulating the production of glucose and amino acids.

=== Proteic products ===
Every gene in this multigene family produces a specific proteic product which has a great importance in the regulation of pregnancy, concretely in the correct embryo growth.

In the hGH-hPL complex, formed by 5 genes, there's only one gene which is not expressed in the placenta: the hGH-N gene, expressed in the hypophysis. This gene produces an isoform of 22 kilodaltons and another one of 20 kilodaltons. Both of them end up in the bloodstream with the other hormones coming from the pituitary gland.

The rest of the genes produce a set of peptides found in the placenta. On the one hand, the hGH-V gene produces two isoforms in different proportions: one of 22 kDa and the other one of 26 kDa. On the other hand, the hPL-3 and hPL-4 genes interact together secreting chorionic somatomammotropin, also called placental lactogen. The proportion of each gene in this interaction depends on every individual and is different for every pregnancy, going from a 1:1 to a 1:6 proportion of hPL-3 and hPL-4.

Finally, the hPL-1 pseudogene does not have a proteic product. Firstly, it was thought that this gene was inactive and was not transcribed. However, some posterior studies showed a small presence of the hPL-1 gene in the placenta. The absence of a proteic product produced by this gene has not been explained yet though.

=== Regulation of the genes ===
- The union region of the Pit-1 factor is responsible of the hGH-N and hPL genes expression. However, there is a region where some proteins act as inhibitors of the merger between Pit-1 and hPLs genes blocking the expression of placental genes in the hypophysis.
- The AP-2, NFj and USF factors boost Pit1 action by making a merge with the gene promoter in the opening transcription site.
- Spl factor is very important for the regulation of both hPL and hGH-V genes as the deletion of its union site decreases the expression in some placental cells.

== Absence of the multigenic complex ==
In pregnancies with complete lack of HPL and hGH-V in the placenta, the embryo suffers from a retarded growth; however, this is the only trascendental consequence and the embryo results on a healthy normal baby. The analysis in this cases show that HPL, hPL-4, hPL-3 and hGH-V genes were eliminated while hPL-1 remained intact.
