= NCGS =

NCGS may refer to:

== Medicine ==
- National Cooperative Growth Study, U.S. childhood growth disorder database
- Non-celiac gluten sensitivity

== Government ==
- National Committee on Geological Sciences, Philippines; see Science and technology in the Philippines
- North Carolina General Statute, part of law of North Carolina
  - North Carolina General Schedule, a law of North Carolina

== Other uses ==
- National Coalition of Girls’ Schools, USA
- North Cestrian Grammar School, Altrincham, Cheshire, England, UK

== See also ==
- NCG (disambiguation), for the singular of NCGs
- CGS (disambiguation)
- CG (disambiguation)
