= GH2 =

GH2 may refer to:

- Green hydrogen
- Growth hormone 2
- Guam Highway 2 (GH-2)
- Guitar Hero II
- Hill GH2, a Formula one car (1975–1976)
- A series of Panasonic cameras, see Panasonic Lumix DMC-GH2
