= Growth hormone in sports =

Use of growth hormones for athletic enhancement

Growth hormones in sports refers to the use of growth hormones (GH or HGH) for athletic enhancement, as opposed to growth hormone treatment for medical therapy. Human Growth Hormone is a prescription medication in the US, meaning that its distribution and use without a prescription is illegal. There is limited evidence that GH doping improves athletic performance, although the perception that it does is common in the sporting community. Potential side effects of long term GH doping could mirror the symptoms of acromegaly, a disease in which the anterior pituitary gland produces excess growth hormone. These symptoms include swelling of the hands and feet, joint pain, fluid retention, and excessive sweating.

== Overview ==
Human growth hormone occurs naturally in the human body where it functions by stimulating growth of essentially all tissues, including bone. Use of exogenous human growth hormone (HGH), via injection, was originally for medical purposes until athletes began abusing HGH with the goal of increasing their abilities. Before recombinant human growth hormone (rHGH) was developed in 1981, HGH was only available by extracting it from the pituitary glands of cadavers. The arrival of rHGH combined with other peptide hormone advancements has increased the availability of HGH on both the legitimate and black markets. The first description of the use of GH as a doping agent was Dan Duchaine's "Underground Steroid handbook" which emerged from California in 1982; it is not known where and when GH was first used this way. In 1989 the International Olympic Committee became the first to brand human growth hormone a banned substance. Although abuse of human growth hormone for athletic purposes is illegal in the U.S., over the past decade it appears that abuse of HGH is present in all levels of sport. This is fueled at least in part by the fact that HGH is more difficult to detect than most other performance-enhancing drugs, such as anabolic steroids. This is because rHGH has an identical amino acid sequence to the native isoform of the hormone while GH from cadavers is indistinguishable from endogenous GH. Athletes competing in power sports, bodybuilding, professional wrestling, mixed martial arts, swimming, baseball, strength sports, track and field, cycling, soccer, weight lifting, skiing and endurance sports have been said to abuse human growth hormone, including in combination with other performance-enhancing drugs such as androgenic anabolic steroids including testosterone, certain products which claim to enhance HGH, and erythropoietin (among others).

There has never been an adequately large randomized controlled trial showing definitively that HGH provides benefits to athletes and that there are no significant adverse drug reactions; there have been many small studies and several of these studies were recently reviewed and analyzed in a meta-analysis. While the authors indicated that the meta-analysis was limited by the fact that few of the included studies evaluated athletic performance and by the fact that dosing protocols in the studies may not reflect real-world doses and regimens, their conclusions were as follows:

Claims that growth hormone enhances physical performance are not supported by the scientific literature. Although the limited available evidence suggests that growth hormone increases lean body mass, it may not improve strength; in addition, it may worsen exercise capacity and increase adverse events. More research is needed to conclusively determine the effects of growth hormone on athletic performance.

With regard to adverse drug reactions, there is data from animal studies that "long-term administration of human growth hormone can increase the risk of diabetes, retention of fluids, joint and muscle pain, hypertension, cardiomyopathy, osteoporosis, irregular menstruation, impotence and elevated HDL cholesterol."

A report from the United States House Committee on Oversight and Government Reform on steroid and growth hormone use found that the misguided use of HGH by professional athletes and entertainers was fuelling the industry peddling the drug to the general public for medically inappropriate uses.

== Putative benefits ==
=== Lean body mass ===
Studies have found that HGH reduces body fat and increases lean body mass. However, no increase in muscle strength was observed. This may be explained by short-term fluid retention.

=== Muscle mass ===
Researchers are still debating whether the more noticeable muscles are larger in size as well. It should be clarified, though, that muscle mass is not the same as muscle strength. Some say that human growth hormone will build muscle mass through raised insulin-like growth factors levels leading to heightened protein synthesis without any side effects while other researchers argue that there have been no such findings on young healthy adults. The second argument is more supported by research discoveries that HGH affects muscle protein synthesis no differently than a placebo does.

=== Injury resistance ===
HGH may build up connective tissue within muscles, at least in the short term. If these effects are real they "may promote resistance to injury or faster repair [but] would make the muscle no more capable of force generation". With the release of the Mitchell Report on December 13, 2007, 86 players were revealed to have used performance-enhancing drugs while playing in the Major Leagues. The report stated: "Players who use Human Growth Hormone apparently believe that it assists their ability to recover from injuries and fatigue".

== Drawbacks ==
Acromegaly patients, who have natural growth hormone levels of up to 100 times higher than normal, have lower stamina towards physical activity than people with regular levels. When the patients are treated and their growth hormone levels decrease, their stamina improves. This knowledge is part of the evidence behind the new belief that athletes who use supplemental HGH to raise their levels far above average could actually decrease their exercise tolerance, and thus hurt their athletic performance. Further backing was provided in a study done by the Danish Institute of Sports Medicine. They found cyclists of good health and endurance "were unable to complete accustomed cycling tasks after administration of exogenous hGH" and concluded that HGH can inhibit recuperation from exercise. Participants have also been found to have lower stamina after HGH treatment along with higher rates of fatigue. Although adverse side effects can result from excessive doses, typical GH therapy has few side effects and those have likely been overstated due to the excessive amounts administered in earlier studies.

== See also ==
- Biogenesis scandal
- Growth hormone treatment
- HGH controversies
- Lionel Messi
