= Lonapegsomatropin =

Clinical data
- Trade names: Skytrofa
- Other names: Lonapegsomatropin-tcgd; rhGH-PEG; ACP-011; ΤransConPEG hGh; WHO-10598
- License data: US DailyMed: Lonapegsomatropin
- Routes of administration: Subcutaneous injection
- Drug class: Growth hormone receptor agonist
- ATC code: H01AC09 (WHO)

Legal status
- Legal status: US: ℞-only; EU: Rx-only

Identifiers
- CAS Number: 1934255-39-6
- PubChem SID: 381128171
- DrugBank: DB16220
- UNII: OP35X9610Y
- KEGG: D11486
- ChEMBL: ChEMBL4298185

Chemical and physical data
- Formula: C_{1051}H_{1627}N_{269}O_{317}S_{9}[C_{2}H_{4}O]_{4n}

Lonapegsomatropin, sold under the brand name Skytrofa, is a human growth hormone used for the treatment of growth hormone deficiency. Lonapegsomatropin is a prodrug of somatropin.

Lonapegsomatropin was approved for medical use in the United States in August 2021, and in the European Union in January 2022.

== Medical uses ==
Lonapegsomatropin is a growth hormone therapy indicated to treat growth hormone deficiency.

== History ==
The US Food and Drug Administration granted the application for lonapegsomatropin orphan drug designation.
