= Pregnancy hormones =

Human hormones produced during pregnancy

Hormones during pregnancy are the result of an intricate interaction between hormones generated by different glands and organs. The primary hormones involved comprise human chorionic gonadotropin (hCG), progesterone, estrogen, human placental lactogen (hPL), and oxytocin. Hormones are synthesized in certain organs, including the ovaries, placenta, and pituitary gland. These hormones have essential functions in pregnancy test, maintaining the uterine lining, fetal development, preventing premature labor, and the initiation and support of labor.

Subsequently, the hormones are stored and released into the circulation to be conveyed to the specific cells they are intended for. Once they reach the target cells, they are recognized by associated cell membrane or intracellular receptor proteins, leading to a cellular response. There are disorders related to hormonal imbalances, such as breast cancer, hyperrelaxinemia and polyendocrine metabolic ovarian syndrome (PMOS), having a significant influence on reproductive health.

== Human chorionic gonadotropin ==
=== Function and production ===
Human Chorionic Gonadotropin (hCG) is produced from the placenta after the implantation of a fertilized egg in the uterus. Fused villous syncytiotrophoblast cells and extravillous invasive cytotrophoblast cells make hCG. hCG promotes the production of corpus luteal progesterone which helps to maintain the corpus luteum for producing progesterone. hCG also stimulates the production of estrogen and testosterone in the ovaries.

=== Role in pregnancy test ===
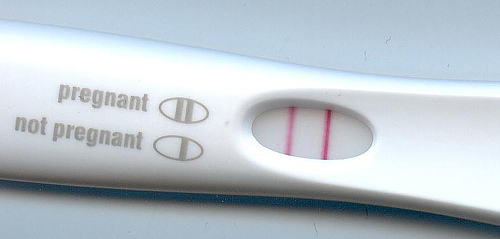
Image of positive hCG urine-based pregnancy test

The hCG present in a woman's urine or blood is used to confirm pregnancy. Urine-based pregnancy tests detect hCG in the urine, while blood-based pregnancy tests measure the level of hCG in the blood. The presence of hCG in a woman's body indicates that a fertilized egg has implanted in the uterus and the placenta has started to form. 10 days after fertilization, significant hCG can be detected from woman's blood sample. The levels of hCG in the body increase rapidly in the first few weeks of pregnancy, doubling every 48–72 hours. The highest level of hCG is reached in week 10 or week 11, later the levels of hCG can be used to estimate the age of the fetus and monitor the progress of the pregnancy.

== Progesterone ==
=== Production and regulation ===
Progesterone is an endogenous steroid hormone synthesized by the placenta during pregnancy. Progesterone production is regulated by the hypothalamic-pituitary-gonadal axis. The HPG axis regulates the release of both central and peripherally generated ovarian hormones. The hypothalamus produces gonadotropin-releasing hormone (GnRH), whereas the pituitary produces gonadotropins such as luteinizing hormone (LH) and follicle-stimulating hormone (FSH). LH, in turn, stimulates the corpus luteum to produce progesterone after ovulation.

=== Function in pregnancy ===
Progesterone plays a crucial role in pregnancy by supporting fetal development and maintaining the pregnancy. It is involved in the menstrual cycle, implantation, and is required for pregnancy maintenance. During implantation, it plays a role in its preservation through modulating the maternal immune response and suppressing the inflammatory response. By decreasing the maternal immune response, progesterone can allow the pregnancy to be accepted. Progesterone prepares the endometrium for implantation, as the level of progesterone increases, the capillaries grow. These capillaries spread throughout the granulosa layer of cells which promotes vascularization and blood flow in the endometrium, ensuring an adequate blood supply to the developing placenta and fetus. On the other hand, when there is no pregnancy occurred, the level of progesterone will decrease, which leads to menstruation. This means that bleeding from women's menstruation is bleeding after progesterone withdrawal.

== Estrogen ==
=== Production and regulation ===
Although it is known that there are several organs that produce estrogen, in women, estrogens are produced by androgens like testosterone and androstenedione. It is synthesized either from the ovaries of corpus luteum during ovulation. The production of estrogen is controlled by the hypothalamic-pituitary-gonadal axis, the hypothalamus releases gonadotropin-releasing hormone (GnRH), which stimulates the pituitary gland to release luteinizing hormone (LH). LH then help signal the production of estrogen in the ovaries.

=== Functions in pregnancy ===
Before conception, estrogen promotes endometrial receptivity by activating paracrine and autocrine signaling. A low level of estrogen can lead to a non-conception cycle, and a high level of estrogen when LH is at its peak, can lead to lower live birth rates and other complications. During pregnancy, estrogen plays a role in supporting placentation through the modulation of angiogenic factor expression. Also, it develops the immune system for uterine through reconstruction of the role of uterine natural killer and T-helper cells. Moreover, estrogen plays a crucial role in breast maturation that prepares women's bodies for breastfeeding and lactation. Induced ducatal component, fat composition in breasts, and growth of connective tissue are all regulated by estrogen.

== Human placental lactogen (hPL) ==
=== Production and secretion ===
During pregnancy, the syncytiotrophoblast cells of the placenta produce a polypeptide hormone, human placental lactogen (hPL), also known as human chorionic somatomammotropin (hCS). in six weeks of gestation, production of hPL in maternal plasma is detected, then the concentration of hPL keeps increasing until week 30 of pregnancy. The secretion rate of hPL is one gram per day, which is the highest rate compared to other hormones.

=== Function in pregnancy ===
Human placental lactogen (hPL) plays a role in supporting the changes needed during pregnancy. It helps in the development of the mammary glands for milk production post-childbirth. Additionally, with estrogen and progesterone, hPL helps in growing alveolar for lactogenesis. Acting as a growth hormone it facilitates fetal development by boosting protein synthesis and cellular growth.

== Relaxin ==
=== Synthesis and release ===
The corpus luteum produces the 6-kDa peptide hormone relaxin. Prolactin and insulin-like growth factor binding protein are two examples of the hormones and growth factors that relaxin can stimulate the secretion of. Preprorelaxin is the collective term for the signal peptide, B chain, C peptide, and A chain found in the coding area of human relaxin genes. The signal peptide is cleaved to produce prorelaxin. Prohormone convertases, such as prohormone convertase-1 and prohormone convertase-2, can convert prorelaxin to mature relaxin.

=== Function in pregnancy ===
As a paracrine hormone, relaxin helps the non-pregnant uterus become ready for pregnancy. Women's endometrium contains relaxin, which is an essential component that helps prepare the body for early pregnancy. The endometrium is transformed into decidua during the early pregnancy maintenance procedure. The process known as decidualization occurs when the endometrium changes both physiologically and morphologically in order to support and maintain an early pregnancy. The final effect of endometrial cell differentiation and lymphoid cell influx is the formation of a tissue that is functionally distinct.

== Corticotropin-releasing hormone ==
=== Production and regulation ===
Corticotropin-Releasing Hormone (CRH) is produced as a component of a prohormone, which is then enzymatically digested and undergoes enzymatic changes to make the amidated version. Peripheral CRH and its receptors have been detected in the majority of female reproductive tissues, such as uterus, placenta, and ovary. CRH may be identified in the mother's bloodstream for the whole duration of pregnancy and has an essential role in controlling the timing of childbirth. Placental synthesis of CRH grows during pregnancy. CRH gene is actively transcribed in the hypothalamus and its expression is controlled by negative feedback mechanism mediated by glucocorticoids. Glucocorticoids enhance the expression of CRH via promoting histone acetylation. Outside of pregnancy, CRH is hardly detectable in human circulation.

=== Role in fetal development ===
CRH is not found in the oocytes of primordial follicles in normal human ovaries. However, there is a significant amount of CRH and its CRH-R1 gene expression in mature follicles . This suggests that CRH has auto/paracrine functions in the maturation of follicles. The level of CRH is greater in the ovaries of premenopausal women compared to postmenopausal women, indicating that ovarian CRH is associated with normal ovarian function throughout the reproductive lifespan.

== Prolactin ==
=== Production and regulation ===
Prolactin is one of peptide hormone that is produced and released by the anterior pituitary gland, as well as the brain, mammary gland, skin, and prostate. Prolactin is essential for the initiation of lactation, the composition or macronutrients in milk and milk synthesis. The hypothalamus regulates prolactin through dopamine inhibition. Dopamine released by many groups of neurons in the brain inhibits the secretion of prolactin by activating D2 Dopamine receptors on lactotrophs in the pituitary gland. Prolactin directly stimulates hypothalamic dopamine neurons, which in turn inhibit the secretion of prolactin, creating a succinct negative feedback mechanism for regulation.

=== Function in pregnancy ===
During pregnancy, the production of prolactin by the mother increases steadily, starting at 6–8 weeks of gestation and continuing until the end of the pregnancy. Prolactin levels in the human fetal circulation see a gradual increase from around 30 weeks of gestation until birth. Prolactin is released into milk at amounts consistent with the typical circulating concentration. By the twentieth week of gestation, mammary glands have reached a sufficient level of development to generate milk components as a result of stimulation by prolactin. Post-lactational involution refers to the process of breast tissue returning to its normal state after milk production stops due to a decrease in prolactin levels.

== Oxytocin ==
=== Synthesis and release ===
Oxcytocin is linked to the process of childbirth and milk ejection reflex. Oxytocin is produced in the brain and several reproductive tissues during pregnancy, while the receptors are produced in reproductive tissues. During human parturition, the quantifiable level of blood plasma oxytocin rises: it becomes twice as much during the initial phase of dilation and continues to increase until the second stage of labor. Oxytocin furthermore induces uterine contractions in mothers following childbirth which helps in the prevention of bleeding.

=== Function during breastfeeding ===
Oxytocin has a crucial role in the process of milk ejection. After sucking, the release of oxytocin stimulates the myoepithelial cell contraction in the breast, which forces milk to move from the alveoli, via the milk ducts, and towards the nipple. Oxytocin is secreted quicker than prolactin. It facilitates the flow of pre-existing breast milk for the current feeding, hence helping the infant in obtaining milk easily.

== Disorders related to hormonal changes ==
=== Breast cancer ===
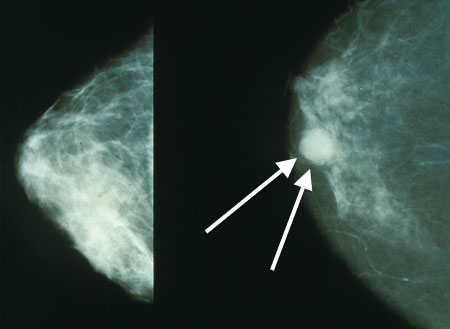
Image of breast cancer (Arrows pointing breast cancer)

Estrogen promotes cellular development and prevents programmed cell death (apoptosis) via activating specific pathways mediated by estrogen receptors (ER) in various types of cells. Estrogen promotes the development of breast cancers that have estrogen receptor (ER) by stimulating the proliferation and survival of breast cancer cells. Estrogen receptor (ER) is a significant indicator for predicting outcomes and guiding treatment decisions, and it is found in around 75% of breast cancers. Estrogen triggers apoptosis in breast cancer cells as well as other types of cells. Receptor levels rise as individuals age among certain ethnic groups, and typically, white women have greater receptor levels compared to black or Japanese women. It has been hypothesized that the absence of a tumor-suppressor gene may lead to the inability to decrease the activity of estrogen receptors when cells enter the cell cycle or the inability to inhibit the division of cells that have estrogen receptors. This might potentially be a mechanism for the development of breast cancer.

=== Hyperrelaxinemia ===
Premature delivery of relaxin is linked to high levels of relaxin in the mother's bloodstream, known as hyperrelaxinemia. This is caused by the impact of relaxin on the cervix, which disrupts the equilibrium in maintaining the structure of cervical connective tissue. Hyperrelaxinemia caused by ovarian stimulation results in an increased rate of the risk of premature labor and preterm birth.

=== Polyendocrine metabolic ovarian syndrome (PMOS) ===
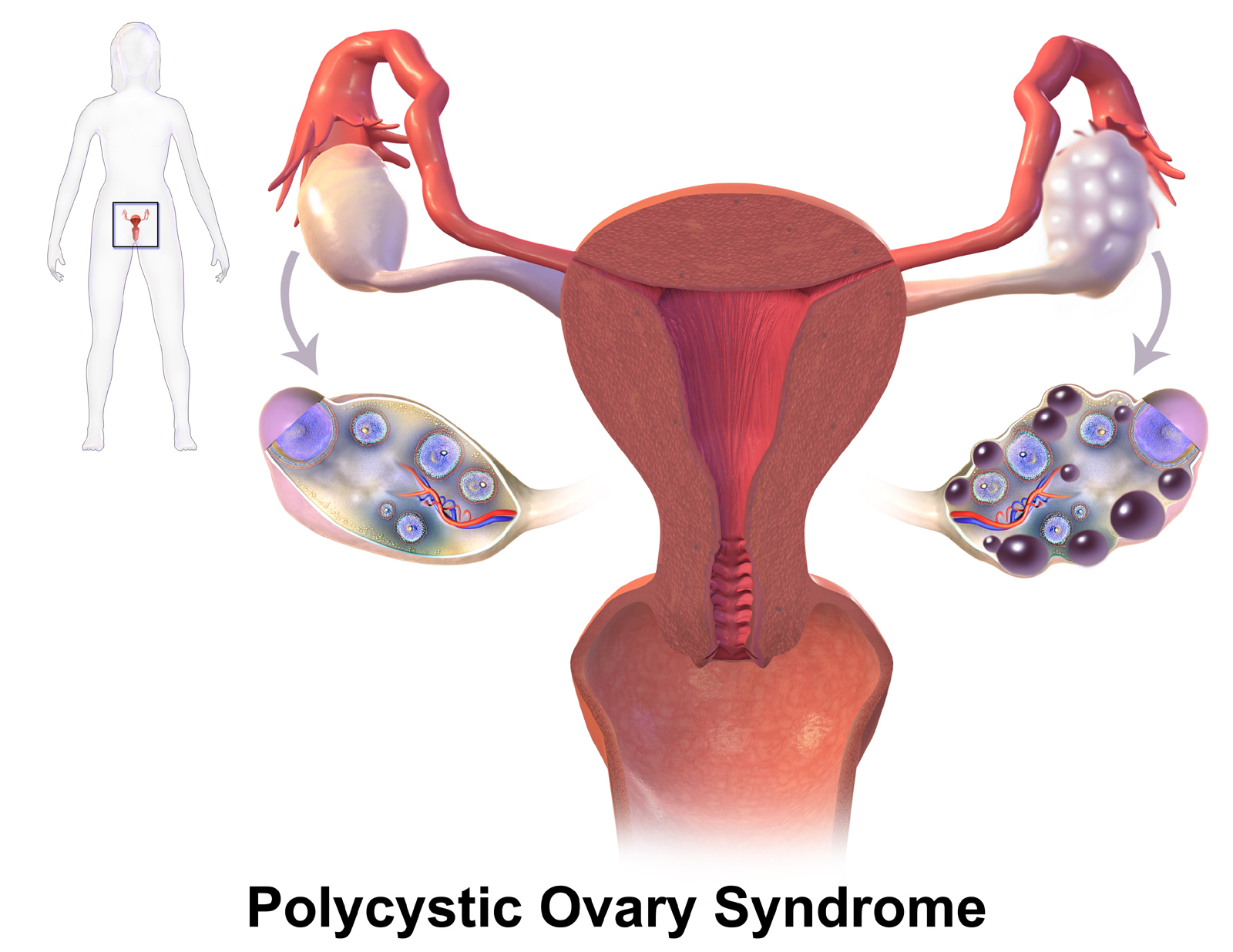
Illustration showing PMOS

Polyendocrine metabolic ovarian syndrome (PMOS) is a diverse condition characterized by the presence of either clinical or biochemical hyperandrogenism together with dysfunction in ovulation. The prevalence of this syndrome varies significantly, ranging from 6 to 15% in the general population. The metabolic characteristic of women with PMOS is the presence of hyperandrogenism and insulin resistance. Women with PMOS are frequently obese and tend to rely on assisted reproductive technologies more frequently than women who do not have this diagnosis.
