= CSH2 =

CSH2 may refer to:

- CSH2 (gene), which encodes a hormone of human placental lactogen
- Isle-aux-Grues Airport, an airport in Quebec, Canada
