= GHV =

GHV may refer to:

- Brașov-Ghimbav International Airport, Romania, IATA code
- gamma-Hydroxyvaleric acid
- Gross heating value
- Growth hormone variant
- Guild Home Video
