= Saizen =

Saizen is a commercial preparation of synthetic somatropin (growth hormone, a.k.a. GH) used for growth hormone treatment. Manufactured by Merck Serono, Saizen is produced by recombinant DNA technology from a mammalian cell line (mouse C127) that was modified by the addition of the human GH gene, resulting in an identical 191-amino acid sequence and structure.

== Usage ==
Saizen is injected. It is intended for long-term treatment of individuals who are growth hormone deficient. Saizen, like all synthetic somatropin, has special importance for children and adolescents whose growth failure is due to inadequate production of growth hormone. Studies have shown that somatropin usage fails to produce athletic performance enhancement despite claims to the contrary. More recently, Saizen has been used in IVF protocols by a few physicians for female patients undergoing infertility treatment in an attempt to increase the number and quality of oocytes retrieved. It affects:

- Tissue growth
  - Skeletal growth
  - Cell growth (especially muscle growth)
  - Organ growth
- Metabolism
  - Protein metabolism
  - Carbohydrate metabolism
  - Lipid metabolism
  - Mineral metabolism
  - Connective tissue and bone metabolism

Saizen usage should be performed under the regular guidance of a physician who is experienced in the diagnosis and management of growth hormone deficiency.

Individuals with inadequate secretion of growth hormone sometimes experience fasting hypoglycemia that is improved by treatment with growth hormone. Using Saizen may decrease glucose tolerance. Because human growth hormone may induce a state of insulin resistance, patients should be observed for evidence of glucose intolerance. As with all human growth hormone supplementation, Saizen should be used with caution in patients with diabetes mellitus or a family history of diabetes mellitus.
