= Serostim =

Serostim (recombinant DNA somatropin) is Serono's brand name prescription drug form of synthetic growth hormone, marketed for HIV-associated wasting.

In December 2007, the U.S. District Court of Massachusetts - in a class-action lawsuit that involved Merck Serono and Serostim - fined Serono a total of $704 million in criminal and civil liabilities for enacting "illegal schemes to promote, market and sell its drug."
