= Merck Serono =

German pharmaceutical company

- Trade name: EMD Serono
- Type: Stock corporation
- Industry: Biotechnology / Pharmaceutical
- Founded: 1668
- Headquarters: Darmstadt, Germany
- Products: Rebif, Mavenclad, Gonal-f, Luveris, Ovidrel/Ovitrelle, Serostim, Saizen, Zorbtive, Erbitux and Bavencio
- Revenue: USD ~5 billion (projected)
- Website: www.merckserono.com www.emdserono.com

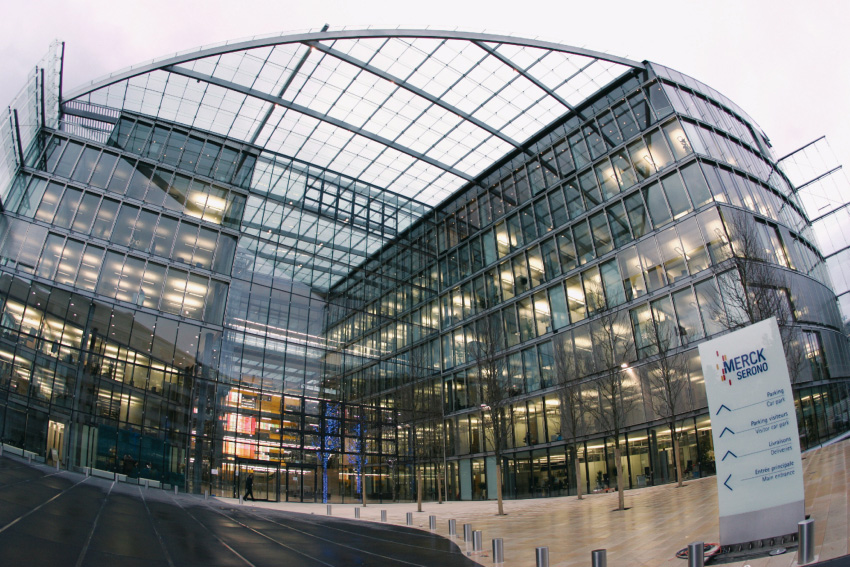
The former headquarters of Merck Serono in Geneva (which now hosts the Campus Biotech).

Merck Serono (EMD Serono in the United States and Canada) is a pharmaceutical company headquartered in Darmstadt, Germany, and a brand and division of Merck focused on biopharmaceuticals.

In September 2006, Merck KGaA announced its intent to purchase the majority of Serono shares from Ernesto Bertarelli and the Bertarelli family. The Merck-Serono merger was announced on 21 September 2006. Merck KGaA and Serono operated as distinct entities until at least January 2007. As of 5 January 2007, Merck held the majority shares of Serono. The new company is called Merck Serono international SA. In 2012, Merck Serono moved its headquarters from Geneva, Switzerland to Darmstadt.

Drugs they market include Erbitux, UFT, Rebif, Mavenclad, Novantrone, Gonal, Ovidrel/Ovitrelle, Zorbtive, Luveris, Saizen, Serostim, Glucophage, Concor and Euthyrox. Raptiva was withdrawn in 2007.

In the U.S. and Canada, Merck Serono is known as EMD Serono, as the former Merck subsidiary Merck & Co. holds the rights to the name Merck in those countries.

== Collaborative research ==
In addition to internal research and development activities Merck Serono with the help of Toledana, is also involved in publicly funded collaborative research projects, with other industrial and academic partners. One example in the area of non-clinical safety assessment is the InnoMed PredTox. The company is expanding its activities in joint research projects within the framework of the Innovative Medicines Initiative of EFPIA and the European Commission.

== See also ==
- List of pharmaceutical companies
- Pharmaceutical industry in Switzerland
- Campus Biotech
- Sutro Biopharma
