= HGH Fragment 176–191 =

Peptide fragment of human growth hormone

Names
- Other names H-Phe-Leu-Arg-Ile-Val-Gln-Cys(1)-Arg-Ser-Val-Glu-Gly-Ser-Cys(1)-Gly-Phe-OH

Identifiers
| CAS Number | 66004-57-7 |
| 3D model (JSmol) | Interactive image |
- InChI: InChI=1S/C78H123N23O22S2/c1-9-42(8)62(101-68(114)47(23-17-29-86-78(83)84)91-69(115)50(30-39(2)3)95-63(109)45(79)31-43-18-12-10-13-19-43)75(121)100-61(41(6)7)74(120)94-49(24-26-56(80)104)67(113)98-55-38-125-124-37-54(65(111)88-33-57(105)89-51(76(122)123)32-44-20-14-11-15-21-44)97-70(116)52(35-102)90-58(106)34-87-64(110)48(25-27-59(107)108)93-73(119)60(40(4)5)99-71(117)53(36-103)96-66(112)46(92-72(55)118)22-16-28-85-77(81)82/h10-15,18-21,39-42,45-55,60-62,102-103H,9,16-17,22-38,79H2,1-8H3,(H2,80,104)(H,87,110)(H,88,111)(H,89,105)(H,90,106)(H,91,115)(H,92,118)(H,93,119)(H,94,120)(H,95,109)(H,96,112)(H,97,116)(H,98,113)(H,99,117)(H,100,121)(H,101,114)(H,107,108)(H,122,123)(H4,81,82,85)(H4,83,84,86)/t42-,45-,46-,47-,48-,49-,50-,51-,52-,53-,54-,55-,60-,61-,62-/m0/s1 Key: CRQXWEZWPKDKLW-YWWHUHEESA-N
- SMILES: N(C([C@@H](NC([C@@H](NC([C@@H](NC([C@@H](NC([C@@H](NC([C@H](CC1=CC=CC=C1)N)=O)CC(C)C)=O)CCCNC(=N)N)=O)[C@H](CC)C)=O)[C@H](C)C)=O)CCC(N)=O)=O)[C@@H]2C(=O)N[C@@H](CCCNC(=N)N)C(=O)N[C@@H](CO)C(=O)N[C@@H](C(C)C)C(=O)N[C@@H](CCC(O)=O)C(=O)NCC(=O)N[C@@H](CO)C(=O)N[C@H](C(NCC(N[C@@H](CC3=CC=CC=C3)C(O)=O)=O)=O)CSSC2

Properties
| Chemical formula | C_{78}H_{123}N_{23}O_{22}S_{2} |
| Molar mass | 1799.10 g·mol^{−1} |

Related compounds
| Related compounds | AOD9604 |
- Except where otherwise noted, data are given for materials in their standard state (at 25 °C [77 °F], 100 kPa). Infobox references

Human Growth Hormone Fragment 176–191 (hGH frag 176–191) is a peptide fragment of human growth hormone. It has erroneously been presented as a lipolytic peptide fragment based on extrapolations of clinical data pertaining to AOD9604, a modified form of hGH frag 176–191. In contrast to AOD9604, hGH frag 176–191 has not been studied in humans.

== Extra reading ==
- Habibullah, Mahmoud M; Mohan, Syam; Syed, Nabeel Kashan; Makeen, Hafiz A; Jamal, Qazi Mohammad Sajid; Alothaid, Hani; Bantun, Farkad; Alhazmi, Alaa; Hakamy, Ali; Kaabi, Yahia A; Samlan, Ghalia; Lohani, Mohtashim; Thangavel, Neelaveni; Al-Kasim, Mohamed Ahmed (June 2022). "Human Growth Hormone Fragment 176–191 Peptide Enhances the Toxicity of Doxorubicin-Loaded Chitosan Nanoparticles Against MCF-7 Breast Cancer Cells". Drug Design, Development and Therapy. 16: 1963–1974. doi:10.2147/DDDT.S367586. PMC 9249349. PMID 35783198.
