= AOD9604 =

Orally active, lipolytic fragment of human growth hormone

Names
- IUPAC name (2S)-2-[[2-[[(4R,7S,13S,16S,19S,22S,25R)-25-[[(2S)-5-amino-2-[[(2S)-2-[[(2S,3S)-2-[[(2S)-2-[[(2S)-2-[[(2S)-2-amino-3-(4-hydroxyphenyl)propanoyl]amino]-4-methylpentanoyl]amino]-5-carbamimidamidopentanoyl]amino]-3-methylpentanoyl]amino]-3-methylbutanoyl]amino]-5-oxopentanoyl]amino]-22-(3-carbamimidamidopropyl)-13-(2-carboxyethyl)-7,19-bis(hydroxymethyl)-6,9,12,15,18,21,24-heptaoxo-16-propan-2-yl-1,2-dithia-5,8,11,14,17,20,23-heptazacyclohexacosane-4-carbonyl]amino]acetyl]amino]-3-phenylpropanoic acid
- Other names H-Tyr-Leu-Arg-Ile-Val-Gln-Cys(1)-Arg-Ser-Val-Glu-Gly-Ser-Cys(1)-Gly-Phe-OH

Identifiers
CAS Number	221231-10-3
3D model (JSmol)	Interactive image
Abbreviations	YLRIVQCRSVEGSCGF
ChemSpider	57582224
PubChem CID	71300630
UNII	7UP768IP4M
- InChI: InChI=1S/C78H123N23O23S2/c1-9-41(8)62(101-68(115)47(18-14-28-86-78(83)84)91-69(116)50(29-38(2)3)95-63(110)45(79)30-43-19-21-44(104)22-20-43)75(122)100-61(40(6)7)74(121)94-49(23-25-56(80)105)67(114)98-55-37-126-125-36-54(65(112)88-32-57(106)89-51(76(123)124)31-42-15-11-10-12-16-42)97-70(117)52(34-102)90-58(107)33-87-64(111)48(24-26-59(108)109)93-73(120)60(39(4)5)99-71(118)53(35-103)96-66(113)46(92-72(55)119)17-13-27-85-77(81)82/h10-12,15-16,19-22,38-41,45-55,60-62,102-104H,9,13-14,17-18,23-37,79H2,1-8H3,(H2,80,105)(H,87,111)(H,88,112)(H,89,106)(H,90,107)(H,91,116)(H,92,119)(H,93,120)(H,94,121)(H,95,110)(H,96,113)(H,97,117)(H,98,114)(H,99,118)(H,100,122)(H,101,115)(H,108,109)(H,123,124)(H4,81,82,85)(H4,83,84,86)/t41-,45-,46-,47-,48-,49-,50-,51-,52-,53-,54-,55-,60-,61-,62-/m0/s1 Key: GVIYUKXRXPXMQM-BPXGDYAESA-N
- SMILES: CC[C@H](C)[C@@H](C(=O)N[C@@H](C(C)C)C(=O)N[C@@H](CCC(=O)N)C(=O)N[C@H]1CSSC[C@H](NC(=O)[C@@H](NC(=O)CNC(=O)[C@@H](NC(=O)[C@@H](NC(=O)[C@@H](NC(=O)[C@@H](NC1=O)CCCNC(=N)N)CO)C(C)C)CCC(=O)O)CO)C(=O)NCC(=O)N[C@@H](CC2=CC=CC=C2)C(=O)O)NC(=O)[C@H](CCCNC(=N)N)NC(=O)[C@H](CC(C)C)NC(=O)[C@H](CC3=CC=C(C=C3)O)N

Properties
Chemical formula	C_{78}H_{123}N_{23}O_{23}S_{2}
Molar mass	1815.10 g·mol^{−1}

Related compounds
Related compounds	HGH Fragment 176–191
- Except where otherwise noted, data are given for materials in their standard state (at 25 °C [77 °F], 100 kPa). Infobox references

AOD9604 (AOD-9604) is an orally active, lipolytic 16-amino acid peptide fragment of human growth hormone and derivative of the C-terminal domain of human growth hormone (HGH). It consists of HGH residues 176–191, with a tyrosine in place of the phenylalanine at the N-terminal end. Initial human trials showed that it retains the lipolytic properties of human growth hormone without stimulating IGF-1 production. However, later studies failed to demonstrate a sufficient lipolytic effect. Its development was terminated in 2007. Despite its limited efficacy, AOD9604 is still banned in athletes and tested for in competition.

== Mechanism of action ==
AOD9604 appears to enhance lipolysis in mice by upregulating beta-3 adrenergic receptors. Beta-3 adrenergic receptor knockout mice are unresponsive to the lipolytic effects of AOD9604.

== Clinical data ==
In a 12 week randomised clinical trial, subjects receiving AOD9604 lost, on average, 1.8 kg more than those receiving placebo. Development of AOD9604 was halted following poor efficacy in a later 24 week trial.

== See also ==
- Adipotide
