= National Cooperative Growth Study =

National Cooperative Growth Study (NCGS) is the largest observational database in the U.S. of children with growth disorders. Started in 1985, NCGS was a long term longitudinal study following patients undergoing growth hormone treatment in North America (the U.S. and Canada). The study was closed in 2010. At that time it had over 240,000 patient-years of statistical data collected for 65000 patients. The related iNCGS (the "i" standing for "International") database is ongoing in Europe, collecting data in the United Kingdom, France, Germany, Italy, Spain and other European Union member countries.

== Sources ==
- Clinical trial number NCT00097539 for "National Cooperative Growth Study (NCGS): A Post-marketing Surveillance Program for Nutropin, Nutropin AQ, Nutropin Depot, and Protropin" at ClinicalTrials.gov
- Bell, Jennifer J.; Lippe, Barbara; Romano, Alicia A.; Cernich, Joseph T.; Swinford, Rita D.; Moawad, Dalia (December 2018). "National Cooperative Growth Study: 25 Years of Growth Hormone Data, Insights, and Lessons for Future Registries". Pediatric Endocrinology Reviews. 16 (2): 240–255. doi:10.17458/per.vol16.2018.25yearsghdata. PMID 30556657.
- Clinical trial number NCT00455728 for "A Post Marketing Surveillance Program for NutropinAq® in Paediatric Growth Disorders (iNCGS)" at ClinicalTrials.gov
