= Somatotropin family =

Somatotropin hormone family

Identifiers
- Symbol: Hormone_1
- Pfam: PF00103
- InterPro: IPR001400
- PROSITE: PDOC00239
- SCOP2: 1huw / SCOPe / SUPFAM
Available protein structures:
- PDB: IPR001400 PF00103 (ECOD; PDBsum)
- AlphaFold: IPR001400; PF00103

The Somatotropin family is a protein family whose titular representative is somatotropin, also known as growth hormone, a hormone that plays an important role in growth control. Other members include choriomammotropin (lactogen), its placental analogue; prolactin, which promotes lactation in the mammary gland, and placental prolactin-related proteins; proliferin and proliferin related protein; and somatolactin from various fishes. The 3D structure of bovine somatotropin has been predicted using a combination of heuristics and energy minimisation.

== Human peptides from this family ==
CSH1; CSH2; CSHL1; GH1; GH2 (hGH-V); PRL;
