= Growth hormone 1 =

Hormone that regulates growth and development

GH1

Identifiers
- Aliases: GH1, GH, GH-N, GHN, IGHD1B, hGH-N, GHB5, Growth hormone 1, IGHD2, IGHD1A
- External IDs: OMIM: 139250; MGI: 95707; GeneCards: GH1
Available structures
PDB	Ortholog search: PDBe RCSB
PDB	List of PDB id codes 1AXI, 1HUW, 1A22, 1HGU, 3HHR, 1KF9, 1HWG, 1BP3, 1HWH

Gene location (Human)
Chr.	Chromosome 17 (human)
Band	17q23.3	Start	63,917,200 bp
Band	17q23.3	End	63,918,839 bp

Gene location (Mouse)
Chr.	Chromosome 11 (mouse)
Band	11 E1|11 68.89 cM	Start	106,191,097 bp
Band	11 E1|11 68.89 cM	End	106,192,691 bp
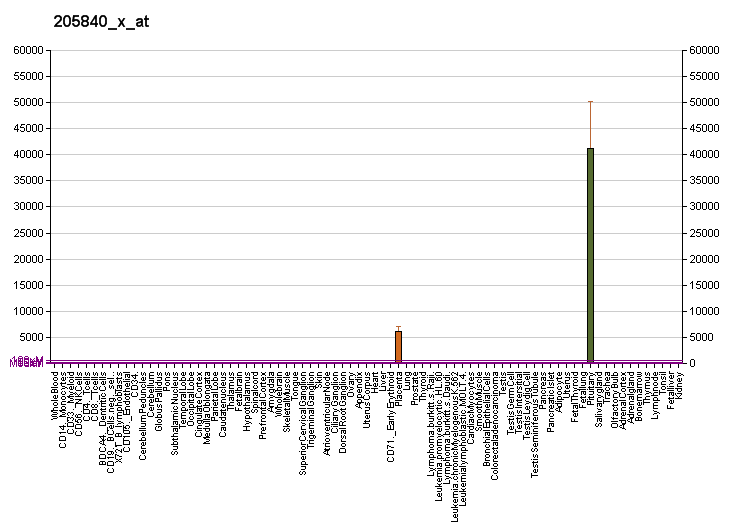

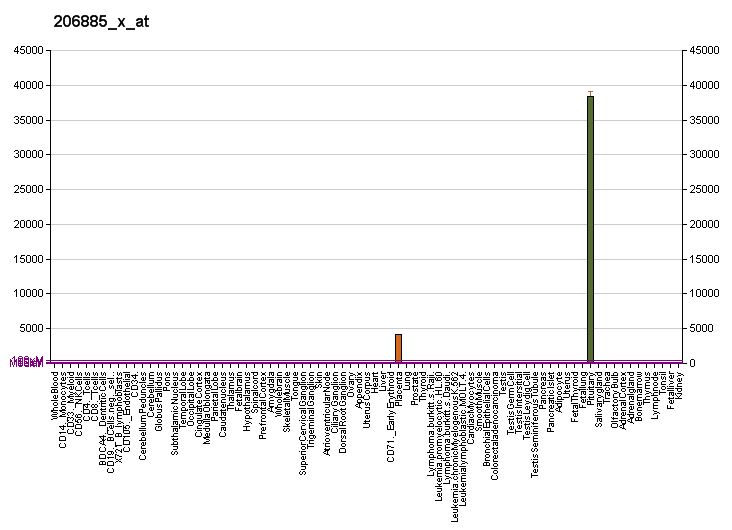

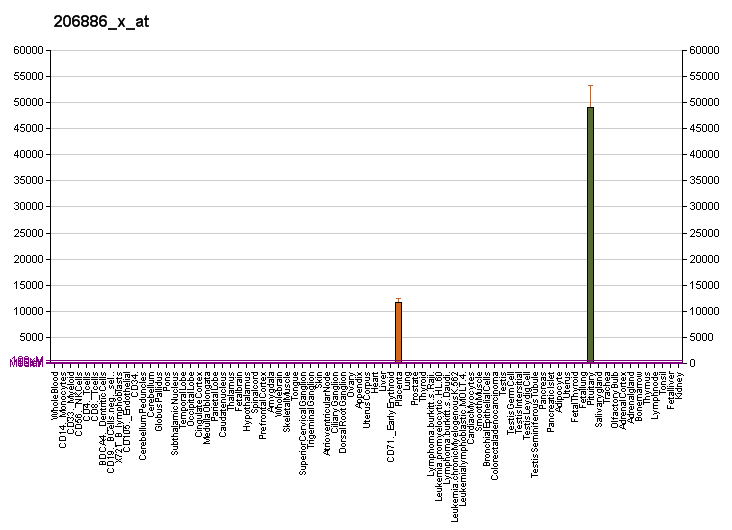
RNA expression pattern
Bgee	Human / Mouse (ortholog); Top expressed in: pituitary gland; anterior pituitary; testicle; granulocyte; right coronary artery; gastric mucosa; right hemisphere of cerebellum; right uterine tube; Descending thoracic aorta; canal of the cervix / Top expressed in: pituitary gland; morula; anterior pituitary; entorhinal cortex; perirhinal cortex; fetal liver hematopoietic progenitor cell; Epithelium of choroid plexus; epithelium of small intestine; nucleus of stria terminalis; choroid plexus of fourth ventricle; More reference expression data
BioGPS	More reference expression data
Gene ontology
Molecular function	hormone activity; metal ion binding; protein binding; growth factor activity; growth hormone receptor binding; prolactin receptor binding
Cellular component	extracellular region; extracellular space; endosome lumen; growth hormone receptor complex; collagen-containing extracellular matrix
Biological process	growth hormone receptor signaling pathway via JAK-STAT; response to estradiol; positive regulation of MAP kinase activity; positive regulation of receptor internalization; bone maturation; growth hormone receptor signaling pathway; positive regulation of insulin-like growth factor receptor signaling pathway; positive regulation of multicellular organism growth; positive regulation of peptidyl-tyrosine phosphorylation; positive regulation of phosphatidylinositol 3-kinase signaling; positive regulation of receptor signaling pathway via JAK-STAT; positive regulation of activation of Janus kinase activity; positive regulation of tyrosine phosphorylation of STAT protein; regulation of signaling receptor activity; positive regulation of glucose transmembrane transport; response to nutrient levels; positive regulation of growth; animal organ development; signal transduction
Sources:Amigo / QuickGO
Orthologs
Databases	NCBI: entry; OMA: entry
Species	Human	Mouse
Entrez	2688	14599
Ensembl	ENSG00000259384	ENSMUSG00000020713
UniProt	P01241	P06880
RefSeq (mRNA)	NM_000515; NM_022559; NM_022560; NM_022561; NM_022562	NM_008117
RefSeq (protein)	NP_000506; NP_072053; NP_072054	NP_032143
Location (UCSC)	Chr 17: 63.92 – 63.92 Mb	Chr 11: 106.19 – 106.19 Mb
PubMed search
- Wikidata
View/Edit Human	View/Edit Mouse

Growth hormone 1, also known as pituitary growth hormone or simply as growth hormone (GH) somatotropin, is a hormone that in humans is encoded by the GH1 gene. This is the primary form of growth hormone produced in the pituitary gland, as opposed to other forms like GH2 which are produced by the placenta during development.

The protein encoded by this gene is a member of the somatotropin/prolactin family of hormones that play an important role in growth control. The gene, along with four other related genes, is located at the growth hormone locus on chromosome 17 where they are interspersed in the same transcriptional orientation, an arrangement thought to have evolved by a series of gene duplications. The five genes share a remarkably high degree of sequence identity. Alternative splicing generates additional isoforms of each of the five growth hormones, leading to further diversity and potential for specialization. This particular family member is expressed in the pituitary but not in placental tissue as is the case for the other four genes in the growth hormone locus. Mutations in or deletions of the gene lead to growth hormone deficiency and short stature.

== See also ==
- Placental growth hormone
- Somatotropin family
