= Growth hormone therapy =

Type of hormone therapy

- Specialty: Endocrinology

Growth hormone therapy refers to the use of growth hormone (GH) as a prescription medication—it is one form of hormone therapy. Growth hormone is a peptide hormone secreted by the pituitary gland that stimulates growth and cell reproduction. In the past, growth hormone was extracted from human pituitary glands. Growth hormone is now produced by recombinant DNA technology and is prescribed for a variety of reasons. GH therapy has been a focus of social and ethical controversies for 50 years.

This article describes the history of GH treatment and the current uses and risks arising from GH use. Other articles describe GH physiology, diseases of GH excess (acromegaly and pituitary gigantism), deficiency, the recent phenomenon of HGH controversies, growth hormone in sports, and growth hormone for cows.

== Medical uses ==
=== HGH deficiency in children ===
Growth hormone deficiency is treated by replacing growth hormone.

Lonapegsomatropin was approved for medical use in the United States in August 2021.

=== HGH deficiency in adults ===
The Endocrine Society has recommended that adult patients diagnosed with growth hormone deficiency (GHd) be administered an individualized GH treatment regimen. With respect to diagnosis, their guidelines state that "adults patients with structural hypothalamic/pituitary disease, surgery or irradiation in these areas, head trauma, or evidence of other pituitary hormone deficiencies be considered for evaluation for acquired GHd" and that "idiopathic GHd in adults is very rare, and stringent criteria are necessary to make this diagnosis. Because in the absence of suggestive clinical circumstances there is a significant false-positive error rate in the response to a single GH stimulation test, we suggest the use of two tests before making this diagnosis."

GH replacement therapy can provide a number of measurable benefits to GH-deficient adults. These include improved bone density, increased muscle mass, decrease of adipose tissue, faster hair and nail growth, strengthened immune system, increased circulatory system, and improved blood lipid levels, but long term mortality benefit has not yet been demonstrated.

A peer-reviewed article published in 2010 indicates that "Growth hormone (GH) replacement unequivocally benefits growth, body composition, cardiovascular risk factors and quality of life. Less is known about the effects of GH on learning and memory."

=== Other ===
As of 2004, GH has been approved by the U.S. Food and Drug Administration for treatment of other conditions such as:

- In adults, wasting (or cachexia) caused by AIDS.
- Turner syndrome epitomizes the response of non-deficient shortness. At doses 20% higher than those used in GH deficiency, growth accelerates. With several years of treatment the median gain in adult height is about 5-8 cm on this dose. The gains appear to be dose-dependent. It has been used successfully in toddlers with Turner syndrome, as well as in older girls.
- Short-stature homeobox gene deficiency
- Chronic kidney failure results in many problems, including growth failure. GH treatment for several years both before and after transplantation may prevent further deceleration of growth and may narrow the height deficit, though even with treatment net adult height loss may be about 10 cm
- Prader–Willi syndrome, a generally non-hereditary genetic condition, is a case where GH is prescribed for benefits in addition to height. GH is one of the treatment options an experienced endocrinologist may use when treating a child with PWS. GH can help children with PWS in height, weight, body mass, strength, and agility.. Reports have indicated increase of growth rate (especially in the first year of treatment) and a variety of other positive effects, including improved body composition (higher muscle mass, lower fat mass); improved weight management; increased energy and physical activity; improved strength, agility, and endurance; and improved respiratory function. The Prader–Willi Syndrome Association (US) recommends that a sleep study be conducted before initiating GH treatment in a child with PWS. At this time there is no direct evidence of a causative link between growth hormone and the respiratory problems seen in PWS (among both those receiving and those not receiving GH treatment), including sudden death. A follow-up sleep study after one year of GH treatment may also be indicated. GH (specifically Pfizer's version, Genotropin) is the only treatment that has received an FDA indication for children with PWS. The FDA indication only applies to children.
- Children short because of intrauterine growth retardation are small for gestational age at birth for a variety of reasons. If early catch-up growth does not occur and their heights remain below the third percentile by 2 or 3 years of age, adult height is likely to be similarly low. High-dose GH treatment has been shown to accelerate growth, but data on long term benefits and risks are limited.
- Idiopathic short stature (ISS) is one of the most controversial indications for GH as pediatric endocrinologists do not agree on its definition, diagnostic criteria, or limits. The term has been applied to children with severe unexplained shortness that will result in an adult height below the 3rd percentile. In the late 1990s, the pharmaceutical manufacturer Eli Lilly and Company sponsored trials of their brand of rHGH (Humatrope) in children with extreme ISS, those at least 2.25 standard deviations below mean (in the lowest 1.2 percent of the population). These boys and girls appeared to be headed toward heights of less than 160 cm and 150 cm respectively. They were treated for about four years and gained 4-8 cm in adult height. Controversy has arisen as to whether all of these children were truly "short normal" children, since the average IGF1 was low. Approval of HGH for the treatment of this extreme degree of shortness led to an increase in the number of parents seeking its use to make otherwise normal children a little taller.

== Adverse effects ==
The New England Journal of Medicine published two editorials in 2003 expressing concern about off-label uses of HGH and the proliferation of advertisements for "HGH-Releasing" dietary supplements, and emphasized that there is no evidence that use of HGH in healthy adults or in geriatric patients is safe and effective – and especially emphasized that risks of long-term HGH treatment are unknown. One editorial was by Jeffrey M. Drazen, M.D., the editor-in-chief of the journal; the other one was by Mary Lee Vance, who provided the NEJM's editorial original, cautious comment on a much cited 1990 study on the use of HGH in geriatric patients with low growth hormone levels.

A small but controlled study of GH given to severely ill adults in an intensive care unit setting for the purpose of increasing strength and reducing the muscle wasting of critical illness showed a higher mortality rate for the patients having received GH. The reason is unknown, but GH is now rarely used in ICU patients unless they have severe growth hormone deficiency.

GH treatment usually decreases insulin sensitivity, but some studies showed no evidence for increased diabetes incidence in GH-treated adult hypopituitary patients.

In past it was believed that GH treatment could increase the cancer risk; a large study recently concluded that "With relatively short follow-up, the overall primary cancer risk in 6840 patients receiving GH as adults was not increased. Elevated SIRs (which is risk of getting cancer) were found for subgroups in the USA cohort defined by age <35 years or childhood onset GH deficiency."

The FDA issued a Safety Communication in August 2011, stating that the evidence regarding recombinant human growth hormone and increased risk of death is inconclusive after reviewing sources including a French study which compared persons with certain kinds of short stature (idiopathic growth hormone deficiency and idiopathic or gestational short stature) treated with recombinant human growth hormone during childhood and who were followed over a long period of time, with individuals in the general population of France.

== History ==
Perhaps the most famous person who exemplified the appearance of untreated congenital growth hormone deficiency was Charles Sherwood Stratton (1838–1883), who was exhibited by P. T. Barnum as General Tom Thumb, and married Lavinia Warren. Pictures of the couple show the typical adult features of untreated severe growth hormone deficiency. Despite the severe shortness, limbs and trunks are proportional.

By the middle of the twentieth century, endocrinologists understood the clinical features of growth hormone deficiency. GH is a protein hormone, like insulin, which had been purified from pig and cow pancreases for treatment of type 1 diabetes since the 1920s. However, pig and cow GH did not work at all in humans, due to greater species-to-species variation of molecular structure (i.e., insulin is considered more "evolutionarily conserved" than GH).

=== Extraction for treatment ===
Extracted growth hormone was used since the late 1950s until the late 1980s when its use was replaced by recombinant GH.

In the late 1950s, Maurice Raben purified enough GH from human pituitary glands to successfully treat a GH-deficient boy. A few endocrinologists began to help parents of severely GH-deficient children to make arrangements with local pathologists to collect human pituitary glands after removal at autopsy. Parents would then contract with a biochemist to purify enough growth hormone to treat their child. Few families could manage such a complicated undertaking.

In 1960, the National Pituitary Agency was formed as a branch of the U.S. National Institutes of Health. The purpose of this agency was to supervise the collection of human pituitary glands when autopsies were performed, arrange for large-scale extraction and purification of GH, and distribute it to a limited number of pediatric endocrinologists for treating GH-deficient children under research protocols. Canada, UK, Australia, New Zealand, France, Israel, and other countries establish similar government-sponsored agencies to collect pituitaries, purify GH, and distribute it for treatment of severely GH-deficient children.

Supplies of this "cadaver growth hormone" were limited, and only the most severely deficient children were treated. From 1963 to 1985 about 7,700 children in the U.S. and 27,000 children worldwide were given GH extracted from human pituitary glands to treat severe GH deficiency. Physicians trained in the relatively new specialty of pediatric endocrinology provided most of this care, but in the late 1960s there were only a hundred of these physicians in a few dozen of the largest university medical centers around the world.

In 1977, the NPA GH extraction and purification procedure was refined and improved.

A shortage of available cadaver GH worsened in the late 1970s as the autopsy rate in the U.S. declined, while the number of pediatric endocrinologists able to diagnose and treat GH deficiency increased. GH was "rationed." Often, treatment would be stopped when a child reached an arbitrary minimal height, such as 5 ft 0 in (1.52 m). Children who were short for reasons other than severe GH deficiency were lied to and told that they would not benefit from treatment. Only those pediatric endocrinologists that remained at university medical centers with departments able to support a research program had access to NPA growth hormone.

In the late 1970s, a Swedish pharmaceutical company, Kabi, contracted with a number of hospitals in Europe to buy pituitary glands for the first commercial GH product, Crescormon. Although an additional source of GH was welcomed, Crescormon was greeted with ambivalence by pediatric endocrinologists in the United States. The first concern was that Kabi would begin to purchase pituitaries in the U.S., which would quickly undermine the NPA, which relied on a donation system like blood transfusion. The second offense was Kabi-Pharmacia's marketing campaign, which was directed at primary care physicians under the slogan, "Now, you determine the need," implying that the services of a specialist were not needed for growth hormone treatment anymore and that any short child might be a candidate for treatment. Although the Crescormon controversy in the U.S. is long forgotten, Kabi's pituitary purchase program continued to generate scandal in Europe as recently as 2000.

=== Recombinant human growth hormone (rHGH) ===
In 1981, the new American corporation Genentech, after collaboration with Kabi, developed and started trials of recombinant human growth hormone (rHGH) made by a new technology (recombinant DNA) in which human genes were inserted into bacteria so that they could produce unlimited amounts of the protein. Because this was new technology, approval was deferred as lengthy safety trials continued over the next four years.

In 1985, four young adults in the U.S. having received NPA growth hormone in the 1960s developed CJD (Creutzfeldt–Jakob disease). The connection was recognized within a few months, and use of human pituitary GH rapidly ceased. Between 1985 and 2003, a total of 26 cases of CJD occurred in adults having received NPA GH before 1977 (out of 7700), comparable numbers of cases occurred around the world. By 2003 there had been no cases in people who received only GH purified by the improved 1977 methods.

Discontinuation of human cadaver growth hormone led to rapid Food and Drug Administration approval of Genentech's recombinant human growth hormone, which was introduced in 1985 as Protropin in the United States. Although this previously scarce commodity was suddenly available in "bucketfuls", the price of treatment (US$10,000–30,000 per year) was the highest at the time. Genentech justified it by the prolonged research and development investment, orphan drug status, and a pioneering post-marketing surveillance registry for tracking safety and effectiveness (National Cooperative Growth Study).

Within a few years, GH treatment had become more common and competitors entered the market. Eli Lilly launched a competing natural sequence growth hormone (Humatrope). Pharmacia (formerly Kabi, now Pfizer) introduced Genotropin. Novo introduced Norditropin. Serono (now EMD Serono) introduced Saizen and Serostim. Ferring has introduced Zomacton. Genentech eventually introduced another HGH product, Nutropin, and stopped making Protropin in 2004. Price competition had begun. Teva, which is primarily a generics company, has introduced Tev-tropin. Chinese companies have entered the market as well and have introduced more pricing competition: NeoGenica BioScience Ltd. introduced Hypertropin, GeneScience introduced Jintropin, Anhui Anke Biotechnology introduced Ansomone, Shanghai United Kefei Biotechnology introduced Kefei HGH, and Hygene BioPharm introduced Hygetropin. These are all recombinant human growth hormone products and they have competed with various marketing strategies. Most children with severe deficiency in the developed world are now likely to have access to a pediatric endocrinologist and be diagnosed and offered treatment.

Pediatric endocrinology became a recognizable specialty in the 1950s, but did not reach board status in the U.S. until the late 1970s. Even 10 years later, as a cognitive, procedureless specialty dealing with mostly rare diseases, it was one of the smallest, lowest-paid, and more obscure of the medical specialities. Pediatric endocrinologists were the only physicians interested in the arcana of GH metabolism and children's growth, but their previously academic arguments took on new practical significance with major financial implications.

The major scientific arguments dated back to the days of GH scarcity:

- Everyone agrees on the nature and diagnosis of severe GH deficiency, but what are the edges and variations?
- How should marked constitutional delay be distinguished from partial GH deficiency?
- To what extent is "normal shortness" a matter of short children naturally making less growth hormone?
- Can a child make GH in response to a stimulation test but fail to make enough in "daily life" to grow normally?
- If a stimulation test is used to define deficiency, what GH cutoff should be used to define normal?

It was the ethical questions that were new. Whole meetings were devoted to these questions; pediatric endocrinology had become a specialty with its own bioethics issues.

Despite the price, the 1990s became an era of experimentation to see what else growth hormone could help. The medical literature of the decade contains hundreds of reports of small trials of GH use in nearly every type of growth failure and shortness imaginable. In most cases, the growth responses were modest. For conditions with a large enough potential market, more rigorous trials were sponsored by pharmaceutical companies that were making growth hormone to achieve approval to market for those specific indications. Turner syndrome and chronic kidney failure were the first of these "nonGH-deficient causes of shortness" to receive FDA approval for GH treatment, and Prader–Willi syndrome and intrauterine growth retardation followed. Similar expansion of use occurred in Europe.

One obvious potential market was adult GH deficiency. By the mid-1990s, several GH companies had sponsored or publicized research into the quality of life of adults with severe GH deficiency. Most were people having been treated with GH in childhood for severe deficiency. Many of them stopped injections as they reached their final heights in the low-normal range. However, as adults in their 30s and 40s, these people, who had been children with growth hormone deficiency, were now adults with growth hormone deficiency and had more than their share of common adult problems: reduced physical, mental, and social energy, excess adipose and diminished muscle, diminished libido, poor bone density, higher cholesterol levels, and higher rates of cardiovascular disease. Research trials soon confirmed that a few months of GH could improve nearly all of these parameters. However, despite marketing efforts, most GH-deficient adults remain untreated.

Though GH use was slow to be accepted among adults with GH deficiency, similar research to see if GH treatment could slow or reverse some of the similar effects of aging attracted much public interest. The most publicized trial was reported by Daniel Rudman in 1990. As with other types of hormone supplementation for aging (testosterone, estrogen, DHEA), confirmation of benefit and accurate understanding of risks has been only slowly evolving.

In 1997, Ronald Klatz of the American Academy of Anti-Aging Medicine published Grow Young With HGH: The Amazing Medically Proven Plan To Reverse the Effects Of Aging, an uncritical touting of GH as the answer to aging. This time, the internet amplified the proposition and spawned a hundred frauds and scams. However, their adoption of the "HGH" term has provided an easy way to distinguish the hype from the evidence. In 2003, growth hormone hit the news again, when the US FDA granted Eli Lilly approval to market Humatrope for the treatment of idiopathic short stature. The indication was controversial for several reasons, the primary one being the difficulty in defining extreme shortness with normal test results as a disease rather than the extreme end of the normal height range

Recombinant growth hormone available in the U.S. (and their manufacturers) include Nutropin (Genentech), Humatrope (Eli Lilly and Company), Genotropin (Pfizer), Norditropin (Novo), Tev-Tropin (Teva) and Saizen (Merck Serono). The products are nearly identical in composition, efficacy, and cost, varying primarily in the formulations and delivery devices.

Somapacitan-beco (Sogroya) is the first once-per week subcutaneous human growth hormone (hGH) therapy that was approved in the United States. It was approved for medical use in the United States in August 2020.

== Terminology ==
Growth hormone (GH l) is also called somatotropin (British: somatotrophin). The human form of growth hormone is known as human growth hormone, or hGH (ovine growth hormone, or sheep growth hormone, is abbreviated oGH). GH can refer either to the natural hormone produced by the pituitary (somatotropin), or biosynthetic GH for therapy.

Cadaver growth hormone is the term for GH extracted from the pituitary glands of human cadavers between 1960 and 1985 for therapy of deficient children. In the U.S., cadaver GH, also referred to as NPA growth hormone, was provided by the National Pituitary Agency, and by other national programs and commercial firms as well. In 1985 it was associated with the development of Creutzfeldt–Jakob disease, and was withdrawn from use.

RHGH (rHGH, rhGH) refers to recombinant human growth hormone, that is, somatropin (INN). Its amino acid sequence is identical with that of endogenous human GH.

It is coincidental that RHGH also refers to rhesus monkey GH (RhGH), using the accepted naming convention of Rh for rhesus. Rhesus growth hormone was never used by physicians to treat human patients, but rhesus GH was part of the lore of the underground anabolic steroid community in those years, and fraudulent versions may have been bought and sold in gyms.

met-GH refers to methionyl–growth hormone, that is, somatrem (INN). This was the first recombinant GH product marketed (trade name Protropin by Genentech). It had the same amino acid sequence as human GH with an extra methionine at the end of the chain to facilitate the manufacturing process. It was discontinued in 2004.

rBST refers to recombinant bovine somatotropin (cow growth hormone), or recombinant bovine GH (rbGH, RBGH).
