= Prohibitin-targeting peptide 1 =

Clinical data
- Trade names: Adipotide
- Other names: Prohibitin-TP01; TP01

Legal status
- Legal status: Investigational

Identifiers
- CAS Number: 859216-15-2

Prohibitin-targeting peptide 1 (also known as prohibitin-TP01, TP01 and FTPP; trade name Adipotide) is a peptidomimetic with sequence CKGGRAKDC-GG-_{D}(KLAKLAK)_{2}. It is an experimental proapoptotic drug that has been shown to cause rapid weight loss in mice and rhesus monkeys. Its mechanism of action is to target specific blood vessels supplying adipose tissue with blood, cause the vessels to shrink and the fat cells fed by those vessels to undergo apoptosis. TP01 is designed to bind to two receptors, ANXA2 and prohibitin, that are specific to blood vessels supplying white adipose tissue.

As of 2019, clinical development has been discontinued.

== See also ==
- AOD9604
