= Growth hormone 2 =

Variant of somatotropin produced by placenta

GH2

Identifiers
- Aliases: GH2, GH-V, GHL, GHV, hGH-V, GHB2, Growth hormone 2
- External IDs: OMIM: 139240; MGI: 95707; GeneCards: GH2

Gene location (Human)
Chr.	Chromosome 17 (human)
Band	17q23.3	Start	63,880,215 bp
Band	17q23.3	End	63,881,944 bp

Gene location (Mouse)
Chr.	Chromosome 11 (mouse)
Band	11 E1|11 68.89 cM	Start	106,191,097 bp
Band	11 E1|11 68.89 cM	End	106,192,691 bp
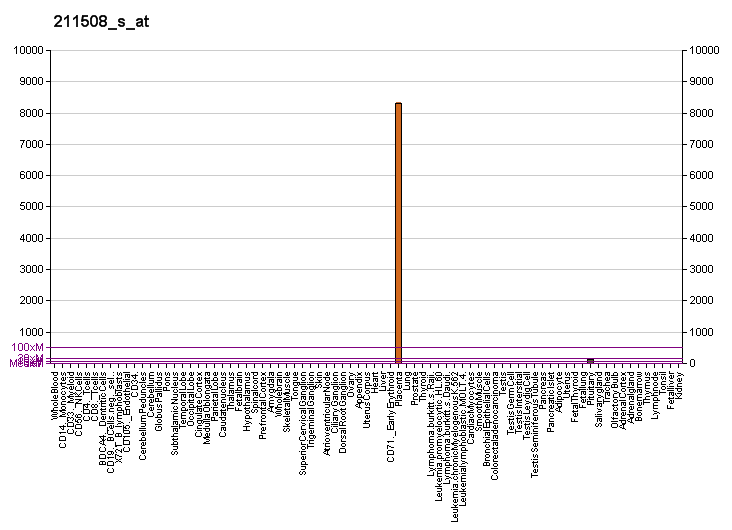

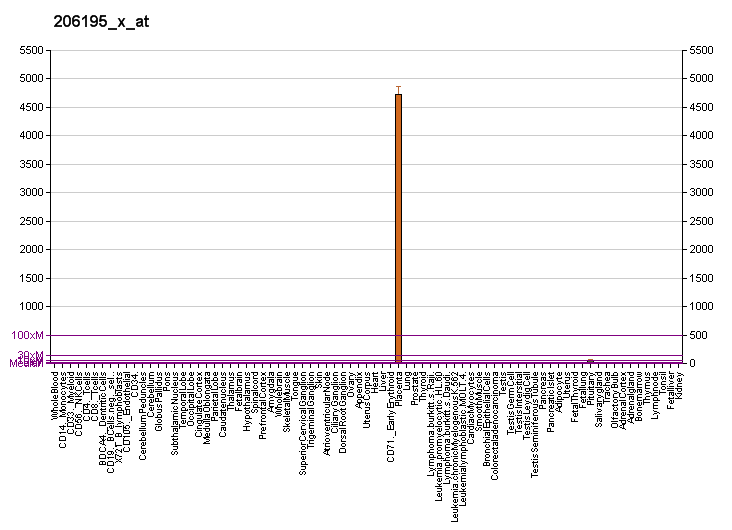
RNA expression pattern
Bgee	Human / Mouse (ortholog); Top expressed in: placenta; pituitary gland; anterior pituitary; decidua; muscle tissue; smooth muscle tissue; metanephros; renal cortex; subdivision of respiratory system; muscle / Top expressed in: pituitary gland; morula; anterior pituitary; entorhinal cortex; perirhinal cortex; fetal liver hematopoietic progenitor cell; Epithelium of choroid plexus; epithelium of small intestine; nucleus of stria terminalis; choroid plexus of fourth ventricle; More reference expression data
BioGPS	More reference expression data
Gene ontology
Molecular function	hormone activity; growth hormone receptor binding; growth factor activity
Cellular component	extracellular region; endosome lumen; extracellular space
Biological process	growth hormone receptor signaling pathway via JAK-STAT; regulation of signaling receptor activity; response to nutrient levels; positive regulation of tyrosine phosphorylation of STAT protein; positive regulation of growth; positive regulation of receptor signaling pathway via JAK-STAT; animal organ development; positive regulation of peptidyl-tyrosine phosphorylation; growth hormone receptor signaling pathway
Sources:Amigo / QuickGO
Orthologs
Databases	NCBI: entry; OMA: entry
Species	Human	Mouse
Entrez	2689	14599
Ensembl	ENSG00000136487	ENSMUSG00000020713
UniProt	P01242	P06880
RefSeq (mRNA)	NM_022558; NM_002059; NM_022556; NM_022557	NM_008117
RefSeq (protein)	NP_002050; NP_072050; NP_072051; NP_072052	NP_032143
Location (UCSC)	Chr 17: 63.88 – 63.88 Mb	Chr 11: 106.19 – 106.19 Mb
PubMed search
- Wikidata
View/Edit Human	View/Edit Mouse

Growth hormone 2 (GH2), also known more commonly as placental growth hormone (PGH) or growth hormone variant (GH-V), is a protein that in humans is encoded by the GH2 gene. It is produced by and secreted from the placenta during pregnancy, and becomes the predominant form of growth hormone (GH) in the body during this time. Its cogener is growth hormone 1 (GH1), or pituitary growth hormone.

The protein encoded by this gene is a member of the somatotropin/prolactin family of hormones, playing an important role in growth control. The gene, along with four other related genes, is located at the growth hormone locus on chromosome 17, where they are interspersed in the same transcriptional orientation, an arrangement that is thought to have evolved through a series of gene duplications. The five genes share a remarkably high degree of sequence identity. Alternative splicing generates additional isoforms of each of the five growth hormones, leading to further diversity and the potential for specialization. As in the case of its pituitary counterpart, growth hormone 1, the predominant isoform of this particular family member shows similar somatogenic activity with reduced lactogenic activity. Mutations in this gene lead to placental growth hormone/lactogen deficiency.

== See also ==
- Growth hormone
- Somatotropin family
