= Sutro Biopharma =

Biotechnology company based in South San Francisco, California

Sutro Biopharma, Inc.

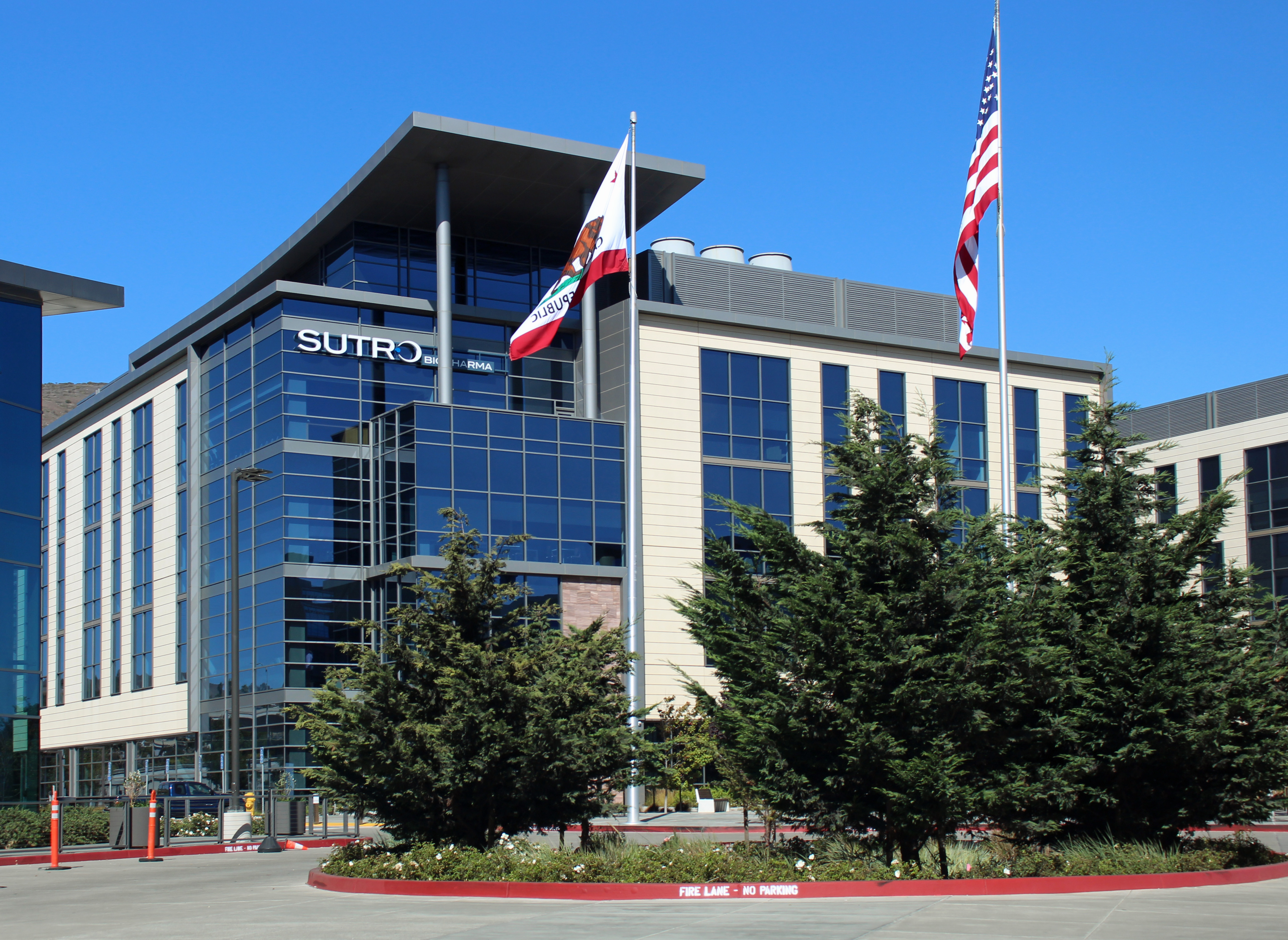
- Headquarters in South San Francisco, California
- Company type: Public
- Traded as: Nasdaq: STRO; Russell 2000 Index component
- Industry: Biotechnology
- Founded: 2003; 23 years ago
- Headquarters: South San Francisco, California
- Number of employees: 290
- Website: sutrobio.com

Sutro Biopharma, Inc. is a publicly traded biotechnology company headquartered in South San Francisco, California focused on clinical-stage drug discovery, development and manufacturing. Using a proprietary cell-free protein synthesis platform, Sutro is working on oncology therapeutics using protein engineering and rational design. Founded in 2003 under the name Fundamental Applied Biology, the company name changed to Sutro Biopharma in 2009. William Newell, CEO as of 2024, joined Sutro in January 2009.

Sutro's cell-free protein synthesis and site-specific conjugation platform, XpressCF+, contributed to the discovery of STRO-001 and STRO-002, internally-developed antibody drug conjugates, or ADCs. STRO-001 is an ADC targeting CD74, a protein highly expressed in multiple myeloma and non-Hodgkin's lymphoma, and is currently in a Phase I clinical trial. STRO-002 is an ADC targeting folate receptor alpha, a cell-surface protein highly expressed in gynecological cancers.

As of 2024 Sutro's drug discovery efforts have focused on antibody-drug conjugates, cytokine-based immuno-oncology therapies, and bispecific antibodies primarily directed at clinically validated targets for which the current standard of care is suboptimal.

== Technology ==
Sutro's Xpress CF Platform is based on Stanford Professor James R. Swartz's patented Open Cell-Free Synthesis (OCFS) technology. XpressCF technology enables the parallel expression of hundreds of protein variants in less than 24 hours, providing a platform for the discovery and development of a wide variety of protein classes including cytokines, vaccine carrier-proteins, antibodies, and novel antibody-based proteins. The XpressCF+ platform allows for precise incorporation of non-natural amino acids into a protein sequence, and Sutro is using this technology to develop homogeneous site-specific antibody-drug conjugates (ADCs). Once identified, production of protein drug candidates can be scaled in Sutro's cGMP manufacturing facility located in San Carlos, CA.

Sutro's technology has also contributed to the formation of SutroVax, a vaccine spin off founded in 2015 that has raised over US$170 million in capital.

== Collaborations ==
In July 2018, Sutro signed a collaboration and licensing agreement with Merck to discover and develop novel cytokine-based therapies for cancer and autoimmune disorders. Sutro received an upfront payment of $60 million and is eligible for milestone payments totaling up to $1.6 billion associated with the development and sale of all therapeutic candidates and all possible indications identified under the collaboration. In 2017, Sutro and Celgene announced they had refocused their 2014 immuno-oncology collaboration on four programs advancing through preclinical development, including an ADC program targeting B-Cell maturation antigen (BCMA).

== Awards ==
The XpressCF Platform was awarded Best ADC Technology Platform at the World ADC in 2018, with Sutro as the runner up for Best New Drug Developer. Sutro was named one of Fierce Biotech's Fierce 15 in 2014. In 2015 was awarded the DiNA Outstanding Partner Award by the California Life Sciences Association.
