= NCG =

NCG may refer to:

== Places ==
- National Cricket Ground (Bangladesh), Purbachal New Town, Dhaka, Bangladesh
- Nicaragua (country code NCG); see List of ITU letter codes and List of IOC country codes
- Nuevo Casas Grandes Municipal Airport (IATA airport code NCG), Nuevo Casas Grandes, Chihuahua, Mexico

== Schools ==
- Nelson College for Girls, Nelson, New Zealand
- NCG, formerly Newcastle College Group, in England, UK
- Nicolaus-Cusanus-Gymnasium Bergisch Gladbach, a school in Bergisch Gladbach, Germany
- Nicolaus-Cusanus-Gymnasium Bonn, a school in Bonn, Germany

== Groups, organizations ==
- National Cancer Grid, India; a national network of cancer centres
- National Centre for Geocomputation, Maynooth University, Ireland
- National Ceremonial Guard, South African National Defence Force; an honor guard battalion of South Africa
- National Coast Guard, Mauritius Police Force, Mauritius
- National Co+op Grocers, USA; a business services cooperative
- National Council of Georgia, Parliament of Georgia, Republic of Georgia
- National Council of Government (Uruguay)
- Nederlandse Kustwacht (ICAO airline code NCG), Netherlands; see List of airline codes (N)
- Neighborhood Cinema Group, Michigan, U.S.; a movie theater franchise in
- New Conservative Group, ACT, Australia; a political party
- Northern Capital Gateway, the operating company for Pulkovo Airport, St. Petersburg, Russia
- NCG Banco, S.A. (NovaCaixaGalicia Banco), Spain; a bank

== Other uses ==
- ncg [ndʒ], a trigraph in the Old English Latin alphabet
- Nisga'a language (ISO 639-3 language code ncg)
- BCS National Championship Game, U.S. college American football game
- neoclassical growth model, neoclassical model of economic growth
- Network of Cancer Genes, a web resource
- Non-circular gear, a gear design
- Noncommutative geometry, a branch of mathematics
- Norton Crashguard, a utility software from Peter Norton Computing

== See also ==
- NCGS (disambiguation)
- NGC (disambiguation)
