= Idiopathic short stature =

- Specialty: Endocrinology

Idiopathic short stature (ISS) refers to extreme short stature that does not have a diagnostic explanation (idiopathic designates a condition that is unexplained or not understood) after an ordinary growth evaluation. The term has been in use since at least 1975 without a precise percentile or statistical definition of "extreme".

== Diagnosis ==
=== Definition ===
In 2003 Eli Lilly and Company offered a more precise definition of ISS when the pharmaceutical company submitted clinical trial data to the U.S. Food and Drug Administration (FDA) requesting approval to advertise their brand of growth hormone for the treatment of ISS. They proposed a definition of a height more than 2.25 standard deviations below mean, roughly equal to the shortest 1.2% of the population.

Other researchers have described a cutoff of 2.0 standard deviations.

== Treatment ==
There is some evidence that hormone treatment may not result in a significant improvement in psychosocial functioning.

It is estimated that it would cost US$100,000 or more to treat someone, but might only move them from the first percentile to perhaps the 10th. There is some ethical and economic concern whether such treatment would merely shift discrimination to the next most affected percentile. The use of insulin-like growth factor 1 or aromatase inhibitors have been proposed as an alternative to growth hormone.

== See also ==
- Growth hormone treatment
