= Human placental lactogen =

Polypeptide placental hormone in humans

chorionic somatomammotropin hormone 1 (human placental lactogen)
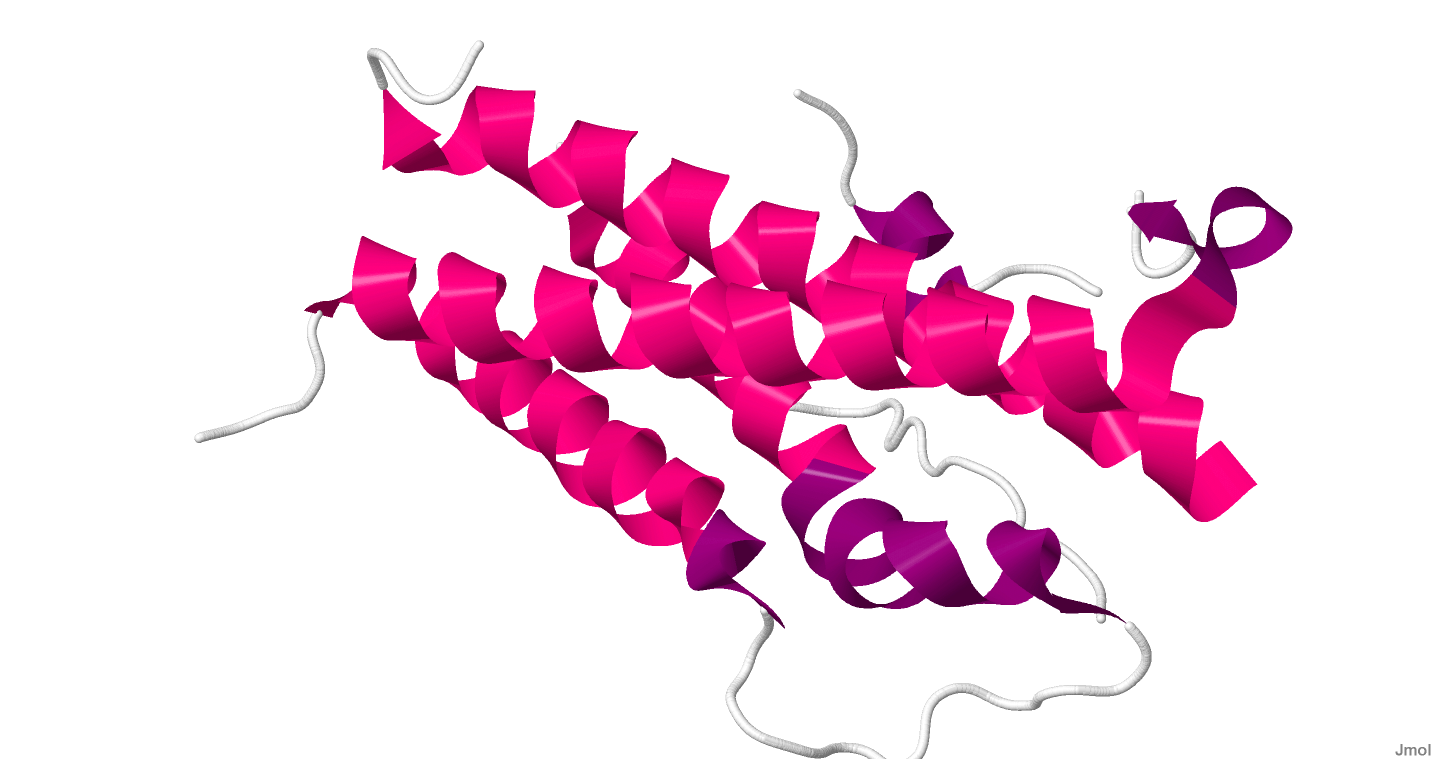
- Crystal Structure of human placental lactogen.

Identifiers
- Symbol: CSH1
- NCBI gene: 1442
- HGNC: 2440
- OMIM: 150200
- RefSeq: NM_001317
- UniProt: P0DML2

Other data
- Locus: Chr. 17 q22-q24
Search for
- Structures: Swiss-model
- Domains: InterPro

chorionic somatomammotropin hormone 2

Identifiers
- Symbol: CSH2
- NCBI gene: 1443
- HGNC: 2441
- OMIM: 118820
- PDB: 1Z7C
- RefSeq: NM_020991
- UniProt: P0DML3

Other data
- Locus: Chr. 17 q22-q24
Search for
- Structures: Swiss-model
- Domains: InterPro

Human placental lactogen (hPL), also called human chorionic somatomammotropin (hCS) or human chorionic somatotropin, is a polypeptide placental hormone, the human form of placental lactogen (chorionic somatomammotropin). Its structure and function are similar to those of human growth hormone. It modifies the metabolic state of the mother during pregnancy to facilitate energy supply to the fetus. hPL has anti-insulin properties. hPL is a hormone secreted by the syncytiotrophoblast during pregnancy. Like human growth hormone, hPL is encoded by genes on chromosome 17q22-24. It was identified in 1963. Its two forms are encoded by the genes CSH1 and CSH2 and differ only by a single amino acid.

== Structure ==
hPL molecular mass is 22 125 Da and contains single chain consisting of 191 amino acid residues that are linked by two disulfide bonds and the structure contains 8 helices. A crystal structure of hPL was determined by X-ray diffraction to a resolution of 2.0 Å.

== Levels ==
hPL is present only during pregnancy, with maternal serum levels rising in relation to the growth of the fetus and placenta. Maximum levels are reached near term, typically to 5–7 mg/L. Higher levels are noted in patients with multiple gestation. Little hPL enters the fetal circulation. Its biological half-life is 15 minutes. Some women with higher BMI show lower levels of placental lactogen, but whether prenatal health behaviors influence hPL levels or if hPL influences infant birth weight is uncertain.

== Physiologic function ==
hPL affects the metabolic system of the maternal organism in the following manners:

- In a bioassay, hPL mimics the action of prolactin, yet it is unclear whether hPL has any role in human lactation.
- Metabolic:
  - ↓ maternal insulin sensitivity (insulin resistance), leading to an increase in maternal blood glucose levels.
  - ↓ maternal glucose utilization, which helps ensure adequate fetal nutrition (the mother responds by increasing beta cells). Chronic hypoglycemia leads to a rise in hPL.
  - ↑ lipolysis with the release of free fatty acids. With fasting and release of hPL, free fatty acids become available for the mother as free fatty acids do not cross the placenta, so that relatively more glucose can be utilized by the fetus. With sustained fasting, maternal ketones formed from free fatty acids can cross the placenta and be used by the fetus.

These functions help support fetal nutrition even in the case of maternal malnutrition.

hPL is a potent agonist of the prolactin receptor and a weak agonist of the growth hormone receptor.

=== Prolactin-like activity ===
hPL has been found to bind to the prolactin receptor with equal affinity to that of prolactin in rabbit milk fat globule membrane, and hPL and prolactin have been found to possess very similar lactogenic activity in vitro in mouse and rat mammary gland explants. In addition, hPL has been found to stimulate DNA synthesis in human mammary fibroadenoma cells transplanted into mice, which suggests that hPL promotes the growth of the human mammary gland similarly to prolactin. As hPL circulates at concentrations that are 100-fold higher than those of prolactin during pregnancy, these findings suggest that hPL may play an important role in human mammogenesis during this time. However, the relative affinities of hPL and prolactin for the human prolactin receptor have yet to be published and the effects of hPL on normal human mammary epithelial tissue have not yet been investigated, and so a definitive role of hPL in human mammary gland development during pregnancy has not been established at present.

=== Growth hormone-like activity ===
hPL has weak actions, similar to those of growth hormone, causing the formation of protein tissues in the same way that growth hormone, but 100 times more hPL than growth hormone is required to promote growth. However, hPL has a blood level of more than 50 times that of hGH, hence its effects must not be ignored. An enhancer for the human placental lactogen gene is found 2 kb downstream of the gene and participates in the cell-specific control gene expression.

== Clinical measurement ==
While hPL has been used as an indicator of fetal well-being and growth, other fetal testing methods have been found to be more reliable. Also, normal pregnancies have been reported with undetectable maternal levels of hPL.

== See also ==
- Placental lactogen in other species
- Pregnancy hormones
- Somatotropin family
