= Placental lactogen =

Type of hormone

Placental lactogen, also referred to as chorionic somatomammotropin, is a polypeptide hormone, produced by the placenta during pregnancy. It influences the metabolic processes of both the mother and fetus, aiding in the growth and development of the fetus. Classified within the somatotropin family, placental lactogen shares both structural and functional similarities to growth hormone and pituitary prolactin. It has been identified in various mammals, including humans, monkeys, mice, cows, hamster, and sheep. However, it has not been found in dogs and rabbits.

== Classification of placental lactogen across mammalian species ==
The initial placental lactogen-related proteins were identified in rodents and are commonly categorized into two primary groups based on the timing of their secretion during pregnancy: those occurring during the mid-pregnancy stage, such as placental lactogen-I, and those occurring during the late-pregnancy stage, such as placental lactogen-II. Similarly, bovine placental lactogen exhibits diversity, through its molecular forms rather than secretion timing, with multiple isoforms differing in molecular weight and charge due to variations in glycosylation and truncated transcripts. While there are many shared characteristics, placental lactogen is synthesized by distinct trophoblast cell types. In sheep, for example, ovine placental lactogen is generated by binucleate cells.
