= Growth hormone =

Peptide hormone that stimulates growth

Growth hormone 1 (pituitary)
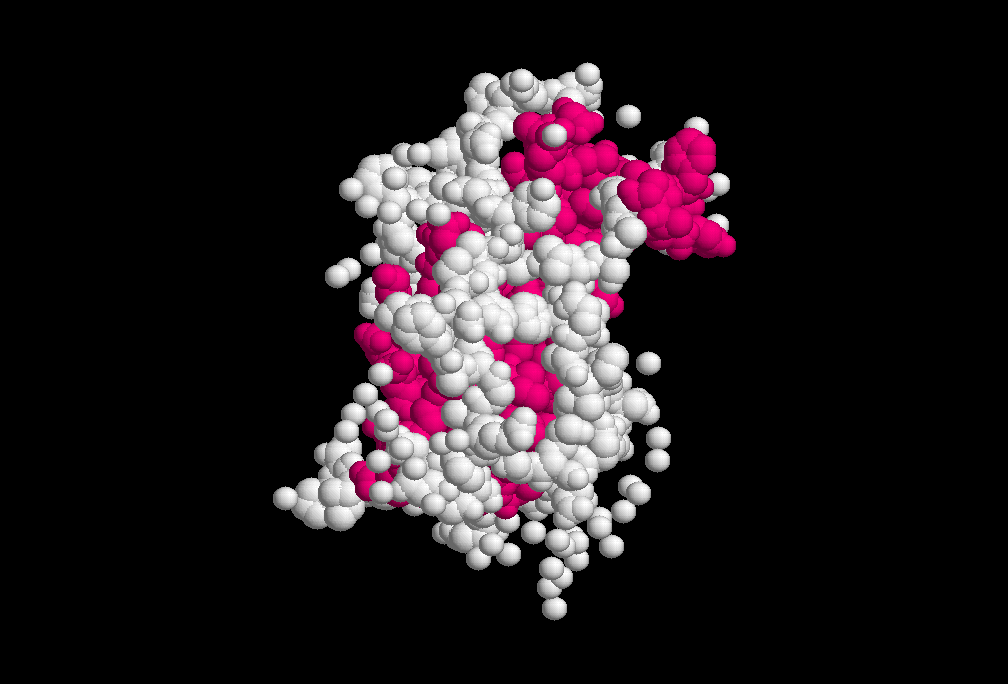
- Growth hormone

Identifiers
- Symbol: GH1
- NCBI gene: 98
- HGNC: 4261
- OMIM: 139250
- RefSeq: NM_022562
- UniProt: P01241

Other data
- Locus: Chr. 17 q22-q24
Search for
- Structures: Swiss-model
- Domains: InterPro

Growth hormone 2 (placental)

Identifiers
- Symbol: GH2
- NCBI gene: 2689
- HGNC: 4262
- OMIM: 139240
- RefSeq: NM_002059
- UniProt: P01242

Other data
- Locus: Chr. 17 q22-q24
Search for
- Structures: Swiss-model
- Domains: InterPro

Growth hormone (GH) or somatotropin, also known as human growth hormone (hGH or HGH) in its human form, is a peptide hormone that stimulates growth, cell reproduction, and cell regeneration in humans and other animals. It is thus central to human development. GH also stimulates production of insulin-like growth factor 1 (IGF-1) and increases the concentration of glucose and free fatty acid. It is a type of mitogen which is specific only to the receptors on certain types of cells. GH is a 191-amino acid, single-chain polypeptide that is synthesized, stored and secreted by somatotropic cells within the lateral wings of the anterior pituitary gland.

A recombinant form of HGH called somatropin (INN) is used as a prescription drug to treat children's growth disorders and adult growth hormone deficiency. In the United States, it is only available legally from pharmacies by prescription from a licensed health care provider. In recent years in the United States, some health care providers are prescribing growth hormone in the elderly to increase vitality. While legal, the efficacy and safety of this use for HGH has not been tested in a clinical trial. Many of the functions of HGH remain unknown.

In its role as an anabolic agent, HGH has been used by competitors in sports since at least 1982 and has been banned by the IOC and NCAA. Traditional urine analysis does not detect doping with HGH, so the ban was not enforced until the early 2000s, when blood tests that could distinguish between natural and artificial HGH were starting to be developed. Blood tests conducted by WADA at the 2004 Olympic Games in Athens, Greece, targeted primarily HGH. Use of the drug for performance enhancement is not currently approved by the FDA.

GH has been studied for use in raising livestock more efficiently in industrial agriculture and several efforts have been made to obtain governmental approval to use GH in livestock production. These uses have been controversial. In the United States, the only FDA-approved use of GH for livestock is the use of a cow-specific form of GH called bovine somatotropin for increasing milk production in dairy cows. Retailers are permitted to label containers of milk as produced with or without bovine somatotropin.

== Nomenclature ==
The names somatotropin (STH) or somatotropic hormone refer to the growth hormone produced naturally in animals and extracted from carcasses. Hormone extracted from human cadavers is abbreviated hGH. The main growth hormone produced by recombinant DNA technology has the approved generic name (INN) somatropin and the brand name Humatrope and is properly abbreviated rhGH in the scientific literature. Since its introduction in 1992, Humatrope has been a banned sports doping agent and in this context is referred to as HGH.

The term growth hormone has been incorrectly applied to refer to anabolic sex hormones in the European beef hormone controversy, which initially restricts the use of estradiol, progesterone, testosterone, zeranol, melengestrol acetate and trenbolone acetate.

== Biology ==
=== Gene ===
Genes for human growth hormone, known as growth hormone 1 (somatotropin; pituitary growth hormone) and growth hormone 2 (placental growth hormone; growth hormone variant), are localized in the q22-24 region of chromosome 17 and are closely related to human chorionic somatomammotropin (also known as placental lactogen) genes. GH, human chorionic somatomammotropin, and prolactin belong to a group of homologous hormones with growth-promoting and lactogenic activity.

=== Structure ===
The major isoform of the human growth hormone is a protein of 191 amino acids and a molecular weight of 22,124 daltons. The structure includes four helices necessary for functional interaction with the GH receptor. It appears that, in structure, GH is evolutionarily homologous to prolactin and chorionic somatomammotropin. Despite marked structural similarities between growth hormone from different species, only human and Old World monkey growth hormones have significant effects on the human growth hormone receptor.

Several molecular isoforms of GH exist in the pituitary gland and are released to blood. In particular, a variant of approximately 20 kDa originated by an alternative splicing is present in a rather constant 1:9 ratio, while recently an additional variant of ~ 23-24 kDa has also been reported in post-exercise states at higher proportions. This variant has not been identified, but it has been suggested to coincide with a 22 kDa glycosylated variant of 23 kDa identified in the pituitary gland. Furthermore, these variants circulate partially bound to a protein (growth hormone-binding protein, GHBP), which is the truncated part of the growth hormone receptor, and an acid-labile subunit (ALS).

=== Regulation ===
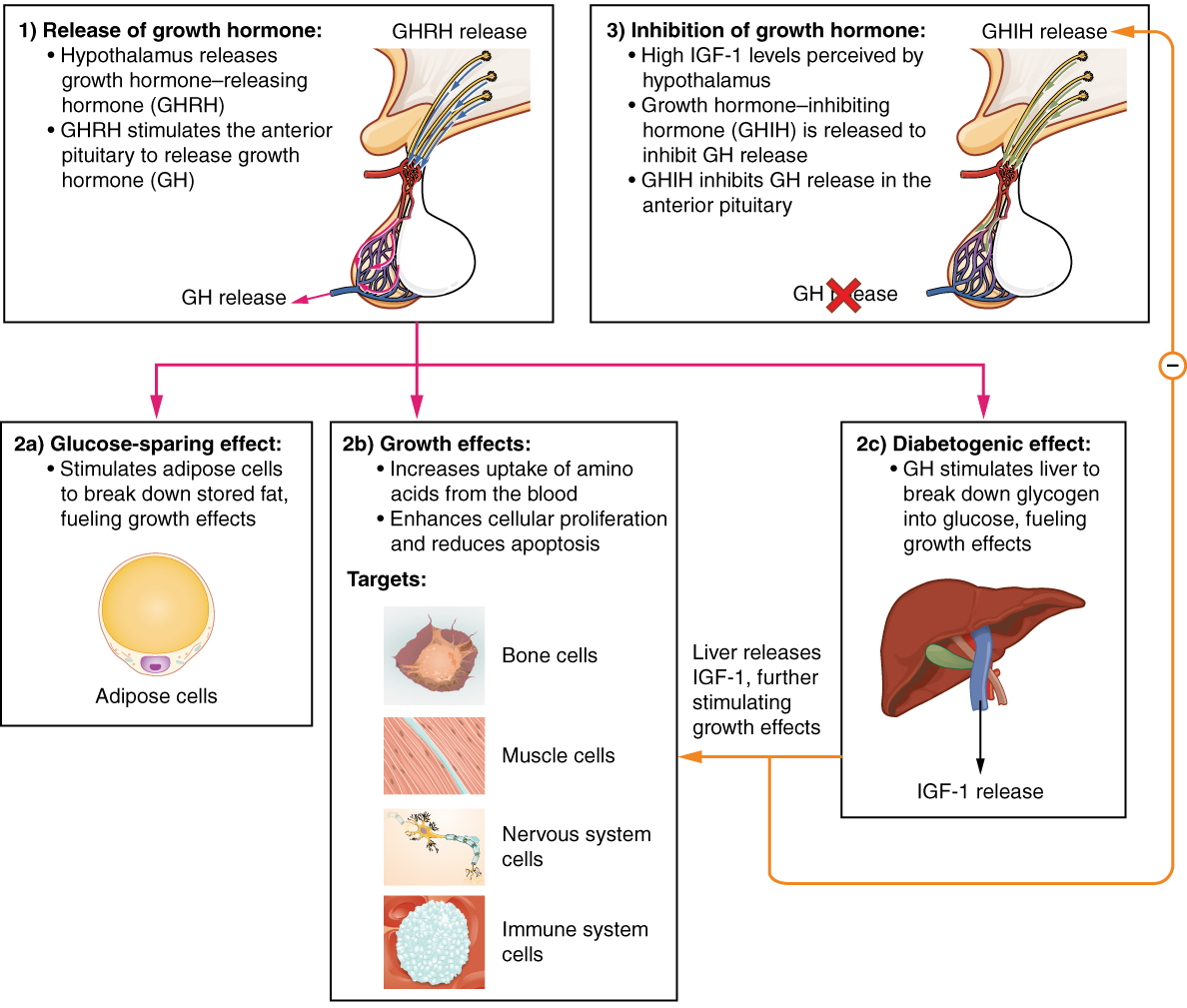
Flowchart showing hormonal regulation of growth

Secretion of growth hormone (GH) in the pituitary is regulated by the neurosecretory nuclei of the hypothalamus. These cells release the peptides growth hormone-releasing hormone (GHRH or somatocrinin) and growth hormone-inhibiting hormone (GHIH or somatostatin) into the hypophyseal portal venous blood surrounding the pituitary. GH release in the pituitary is primarily determined by the balance of these two peptides, which in turn is affected by many physiological stimulators (e.g., exercise, nutrition, sleep) and inhibitors (e.g., free fatty acids) of GH secretion.

Somatotropic cells in the anterior pituitary gland then synthesize and secrete GH in a pulsatile manner, in response to these stimuli by the hypothalamus. The largest and most predictable of these GH peaks occurs about an hour after onset of sleep with plasma levels of 13 to 72 ng/mL. Maximal secretion of GH may occur within minutes of the onset of slow-wave (SW) sleep (stage III or IV). Otherwise there is wide variation between days and individuals. Nearly fifty percent of GH secretion occurs during the third and fourth NREM sleep stages. Surges of secretion during the day occur at 3- to 5-hour intervals. The plasma concentration of GH during these peaks may range from 5 to even 45 ng/mL. Between the peaks, basal GH levels are low, usually less than 5 ng/mL for most of the day and night. Additional analysis of the pulsatile profile of GH described in all cases less than 1 ng/ml for basal levels while maximum peaks were situated around 10-20 ng/mL.

A number of factors are known to affect GH secretion, such as age, sex, diet, exercise, stress, and other hormones. Young adolescents secrete GH at the rate of about 700 μg/day, while healthy adults secrete GH at the rate of about 400 μg/day. Sleep deprivation generally suppresses GH release, particularly after early adulthood.

Stimulators of growth hormone (GH) secretion include:

- Peptide hormones
  - GHRH (somatocrinin) through binding to the growth hormone-releasing hormone receptor (GHRHR)
  - Ghrelin through binding to growth hormone secretagogue receptors (GHSR)
- Sex hormones
  - Increased androgen secretion during puberty (in males from testes and in females from adrenal cortex)
  - Testosterone and DHEA
  - Estrogen
- Clonidine, moxonidine and L-DOPA by stimulating GHRH release
- α4β2 nicotinic agonists, including nicotine, which also act synergistically with clonidine or moxonidine.
- Hypoglycemia, arginine, pramipexole, lysine, tryptophan, γ-Aminobutyric acid and propranolol by inhibiting somatostatin release
- Deep sleep
- Glucagon
- Sodium oxybate or γ-Hydroxybutyric acid
- Niacin as nicotinic acid (vitamin B_{3})
- Fasting
- Insulin
- Vigorous exercise

Inhibitors of GH secretion include:

- GHIH (somatostatin) from the periventricular nucleus
- circulating concentrations of GH and IGF-1 (negative feedback on the pituitary and hypothalamus)
- Hyperglycemia
- Glucocorticoids
- Dihydrotestosterone
- Phenothiazines

In addition to control by endogenous and stimulus processes, a number of foreign compounds (xenobiotics such as drugs and endocrine disruptors) are known to influence GH secretion and function.

=== Function ===
Main pathways in endocrine regulation of growth

Effects of growth hormone on the tissues of the body can generally be described as anabolic (building up). Like most other peptide hormones, GH acts by interacting with a specific receptor on the surface of cells.

Increased height during childhood is the most widely known effect of GH. Height appears to be stimulated by at least two mechanisms:

1. Because polypeptide hormones are not fat-soluble, they cannot penetrate cell membranes. Thus, GH exerts some of its effects by binding to receptors on target cells, where it activates the MAPK/ERK pathway. Through this mechanism GH directly stimulates division and multiplication of chondrocytes of cartilage.
2. GH also stimulates, through the JAK-STAT signaling pathway, the production of insulin-like growth factor 1 (IGF-1, formerly known as somatomedin C), a hormone homologous to proinsulin. The liver is a major target organ of GH for this process and is the principal site of IGF-1 production. IGF-1 has growth-stimulating effects on a wide variety of tissues. Additional IGF-1 is generated within target tissues, making it what appears to be both an endocrine and an autocrine/paracrine hormone. IGF-1 also has stimulatory effects on osteoblast and chondrocyte activity to promote bone growth.

In addition to increasing height in children and adolescents, growth hormone has many other effects on the body:

- Increases calcium retention, and strengthens and increases the mineralization of bone
- Increases muscle mass through sarcomere hypertrophy
- Promotes lipolysis
- Increases protein synthesis
- Stimulates the growth of all internal organs excluding the brain
- Plays a role in homeostasis
- Reduces liver uptake of glucose
- Promotes gluconeogenesis in the liver
- Contributes to the maintenance and function of pancreatic islets
- Stimulates the immune system
- Increases deiodination of T4 to T3
- Induces insulin resistance

== Biochemistry ==
GH has a short biological half-life of about 10 to 20 minutes.

== Clinical significance ==
=== Excess of GH ===
The most common disease of GH excess is a pituitary tumor composed of somatotroph cells of the anterior pituitary. These somatotroph adenomas are benign and grow slowly, gradually producing more and more GH. For years, the principal clinical problems are those of GH excess. Eventually, the adenoma may become large enough to cause headaches, impair vision by pressure on the optic nerves, or cause deficiency of other pituitary hormones by displacement.

Prolonged GH excess thickens the bones of the jaw, fingers and toes, resulting in heaviness of the jaw and increased size of digits, referred to as acromegaly. Accompanying problems can include sweating, pressure on nerves (e.g., carpal tunnel syndrome), muscle weakness, excess sex hormone-binding globulin (SHBG), insulin resistance or even a rare form of type 2 diabetes, and reduced sexual function.

GH-secreting tumors are typically recognized in the fifth decade of life. It is extremely rare for such a tumor to occur in childhood, but, when it does, the excessive GH can cause excessive growth, traditionally referred to as pituitary gigantism.

Surgical removal is the usual treatment for GH-producing tumors. In some circumstances, focused radiation or a GH antagonist such as pegvisomant may be employed to shrink the tumor or block function. Other drugs like octreotide (somatostatin agonist) and bromocriptine (dopamine agonist) can be used to block GH secretion because both somatostatin and dopamine negatively inhibit GHRH-mediated GH release from the anterior pituitary.

=== Deficiency ===
The effects of growth hormone (GH) deficiency vary depending on the age at which they occur. Alterations in somatomedin can result in growth hormone deficiency with two known mechanisms; failure of tissues to respond to somatomedin, or failure of the liver to produce somatomedin. Major manifestations of GH deficiency in children are growth failure, the development of a short stature, and delayed sexual maturity. In adults, somatomedin alteration contributes to increased osteoclast activity, resulting in weaker bones that are more prone to pathologic fracture and osteoporosis. However, deficiency is rare in adults, with the most common cause being a pituitary adenoma. Other adult causes include a continuation of a childhood problem, other structural lesions or trauma, and very rarely idiopathic GHD.

Adults with GHD "tend to have a relative increase in fat mass and a relative decrease in muscle mass and, in many instances, decreased energy and quality of life".

Diagnosis of GH deficiency involves a multiple-step diagnostic process, usually culminating in GH stimulation tests to see if the patient's pituitary gland will release a pulse of GH when provoked by various stimuli.

== Psychological effects ==
=== Quality of life ===
Several studies, primarily involving patients with GH deficiency, have suggested a crucial role of GH in both mental and emotional well-being and maintaining a high energy level. Adults with GH deficiency often have higher rates of depression than those without. While GH replacement therapy has been proposed to treat depression as a result of GH deficiency, the long-term effects of such therapy are unknown.

=== Cognitive function ===
GH has also been studied in the context of cognitive function, including learning and memory. GH in humans appears to improve cognitive function and may be useful in the treatment of patients with cognitive impairment that is a result of GH deficiency.

== Medical uses ==
=== Replacement therapy ===
GH is used as replacement therapy in adults with GH deficiency of either childhood-onset or adult-onset (usually as a result of an acquired pituitary tumor). In these patients, benefits have variably included reduced fat mass, increased lean mass, increased bone density, improved lipid profile, reduced cardiovascular risk factors, and improved psychosocial well-being. Long acting growth hormone (LAGH) analogues are now available for treating growth hormone deficiency both in children and adults. These are once weekly injections as compared to conventional growth hormone which has to be taken as daily injections. LAGH injection 4 times a month has been found to be as safe and effective as daily growth hormone injections.

=== Other approved uses ===
GH can be used to treat conditions that produce short stature but are not related to deficiencies in GH. However, results are not as dramatic when compared to short stature that is solely attributable to deficiency of GH. Examples of other causes of shortness often treated with GH are Turner syndrome, Growth failure secondary to chronic kidney disease in children, Prader–Willi syndrome, intrauterine growth restriction, and severe idiopathic short stature. Higher ("pharmacologic") doses are required to produce significant acceleration of growth in these conditions, producing blood levels well above normal ("physiologic").

One version of rHGH has also been FDA approved for maintaining muscle mass in wasting due to AIDS.

=== Off-label use ===
Off-label prescription of HGH is controversial and may be illegal.

Claims for GH as an anti-aging treatment date back to 1990 when the New England Journal of Medicine published a study wherein GH was used to treat 12 men over 60. At the conclusion of the study, all the men showed statistically significant increases in lean body mass and bone mineral density, while the control group did not. The authors of the study noted that these improvements were the opposite of the changes that would normally occur over a 10- to 20-year aging period. Despite the fact the authors at no time claimed that GH had reversed the aging process itself, their results were misinterpreted as indicating that GH is an effective anti-aging agent. This has led to organizations such as the controversial American Academy of Anti-Aging Medicine promoting the use of this hormone as an "anti-aging agent".

A Stanford University School of Medicine meta-analysis of clinical studies on the subject published in early 2007 showed that the application of GH on healthy elderly patients increased muscle by about 2 kg and decreased body fat by the same amount. However, these were the only positive effects from taking GH. No other critical factors were affected, such as bone density, cholesterol levels, lipid measurements, maximal oxygen consumption, or any other factor that would indicate increased fitness. Researchers also did not discover any gain in muscle strength, which led them to believe that GH merely let the body store more water in the muscles rather than increase muscle growth. This would explain the increase in lean body mass.

GH has also been used experimentally to treat multiple sclerosis, to enhance weight loss in obesity, as well as in fibromyalgia, heart failure, Crohn's disease and ulcerative colitis, and burns. GH has also been used experimentally in patients with short bowel syndrome to lessen the requirement for intravenous total parenteral nutrition.

In 1990, the US Congress passed an omnibus crime bill, the Crime Control Act of 1990, that amended the Federal Food, Drug, and Cosmetic Act, that classified anabolic steroids as controlled substances and added a new section that stated that a person who "knowingly distributes, or possesses with intent to distribute, human growth hormone for any use in humans other than the treatment of a disease or other recognized medical condition, where such use has been authorized by the Secretary of Health and Human Services" has committed a felony.

In 2019, the TRIIM trial paper showed that recombinant human growth hormone restores thymus function, improving the immune system and risk indices for many age‐related diseases.

Despite off-label prescriptions being a normal and legal occurrence in medicine, in 2015 the Drug Enforcement Administration of the US Department of Justice published a position considering off-label prescriptions of HGH to be illegal, and to be a key path for illicit distribution of HGH. This section has also been interpreted by some doctors, most notably the authors of a commentary article published in the Journal of the American Medical Association in 2005, as meaning that prescribing HGH off-label may be considered illegal. And some articles in the popular press, such as those criticizing the pharmaceutical industry for marketing drugs for off-label use (with concern of ethics violations) have made strong statements about whether doctors can prescribe HGH off-label: "Unlike other prescription drugs, HGH may be prescribed only for specific uses. U.S. sales are limited by law to treat a rare growth defect in children and a handful of uncommon conditions like short bowel syndrome or Prader-Willi syndrome, a congenital disease that causes reduced muscle tone and a lack of hormones in sex glands." At the same time, anti-aging clinics where doctors prescribe, administer, and sell HGH to people are big business. In a 2012 article in Vanity Fair, when asked how HGH prescriptions far exceed the number of adult patients estimated to have HGH-deficiency, Dragos Roman, who leads a team at the FDA that reviews drugs in endocrinology, said "The F.D.A. doesn't regulate off-label uses of H.G.H. Sometimes it's used appropriately. Sometimes it's not."

=== Side effects ===
Injection site reactions are common. More rarely, patients can experience joint swelling, joint pain, carpal tunnel syndrome, and an increased risk of diabetes. In some cases, the patient can produce an immune response against GH. GH may also be a risk factor for Hodgkin's lymphoma.

One survey of adults that had been treated with replacement cadaver GH (which has not been used anywhere in the world since 1985) during childhood showed a mildly increased incidence of colon cancer and prostate cancer, but linkage with the GH treatment was not established.

== Performance enhancement ==
The first description of the use of GH as a doping agent was Dan Duchaine's "Underground Steroid handbook" which emerged from California in 1982; it is not known where and when GH was first used this way.

Athletes in many sports have used human growth hormone in order to attempt to enhance their athletic performance. Some recent studies have not been able to support claims that human growth hormone can improve the athletic performance of professional male athletes. Many athletic societies ban the use of GH and will issue sanctions against athletes who are caught using it. However, because GH is a potent endogenous protein, it is very difficult to detect GH doping. In the United States, GH is legally available only by prescription from a medical doctor.

== Dietary supplements ==
To capitalize on the idea that GH might be useful to combat aging, companies selling dietary supplements have websites selling products linked to GH in the advertising text, with medical-sounding names described as "HGH Releasers". Typical ingredients include amino acids, minerals, vitamins, and/or herbal extracts, the combination of which are described as causing the body to make more GH with corresponding beneficial effects. In the United States, because these products are marketed as dietary supplements, it is illegal for them to contain GH, which is a drug. Also, under United States law, products sold as dietary supplements cannot have claims that the supplement treats or prevents any disease or condition, and the advertising material must contain a statement that the health claims are not approved by the FDA. The FTC and the FDA do enforce the law when they become aware of violations.

== Agricultural use ==
In the United States, it is legal to give a bovine GH to dairy cows to increase milk production, and is legal to use GH in raising cows for beef; see article on Bovine somatotropin, cattle feeding, dairy farming and the beef hormone controversy.

The use of GH in poultry farming is illegal in the United States. Similarly, no chicken meat for sale in Australia is administered hormones.

Several companies have attempted to have a version of GH for use in pigs (porcine somatotropin) approved by the FDA but all applications have been withdrawn.

== Drug development history ==
Genentech pioneered the use of recombinant human growth hormone for human therapy, which was approved by the FDA in 1985.

Prior to its production by recombinant DNA technology, growth hormone used to treat deficiencies was extracted from the pituitary glands of cadavers. Attempts to create a wholly synthetic HGH failed. Limited supplies of HGH resulted in the restriction of HGH therapy to the treatment of idiopathic short stature. Very limited clinical studies of growth hormone derived from an Old World monkey, the rhesus macaque, were conducted by John C. Beck and colleagues in Montreal, in the late 1950s. The study published in 1957, which was conducted on "a 13-year-old male with well-documented hypopituitarism secondary to a crainiophyaryngioma," found that: "Human and monkey growth hormone resulted in a significant enhancement of nitrogen storage ... (and) there was a retention of potassium, phosphorus, calcium, and sodium. ... There was a gain in body weight during both periods. ... There was a significant increase in urinary excretion of aldosterone during both periods of administration of growth hormone. This was most marked with the human growth hormone. ... Impairment of the glucose tolerance curve was evident after 10 days of administration of the human growth hormone. No change in glucose tolerance was demonstrable on the fifth day of administration of monkey growth hormone." The other study, published in 1958, was conducted on six people: the same subject as the Science paper; an 18-year-old male with statural and sexual retardation and a skeletal age of between 13 and 14 years; a 15-year-old female with well-documented hypopituitarism secondary to a craniopharyngioma; a 53-year-old female with carcinoma of the breast and widespread skeletal metastases; a 68-year-old female with advanced postmenopausal osteoporosis; and a healthy 24-year-old medical student without any clinical or laboratory evidence of systemic disease.

In 1985, unusual cases of Creutzfeldt–Jakob disease were found in individuals that had received cadaver-derived HGH ten to fifteen years previously. Based on the assumption that infectious prions causing the disease were transferred along with the cadaver-derived HGH, cadaver-derived HGH was removed from the market.

In 1985, biosynthetic human growth hormone replaced pituitary-derived human growth hormone for therapeutic use in the U.S. and elsewhere.

As of 2005, recombinant growth hormones available in the United States (and their manufacturers) included Nutropin (Genentech), Humatrope (Lilly), Genotropin (Pfizer), Norditropin (Novo), and Saizen (Merck Serono). In 2006, the U.S. Food and Drug Administration (FDA) approved a version of rHGH called Omnitrope (Sandoz). A sustained-release form of growth hormone, Nutropin Depot (Genentech and Alkermes) was approved by the FDA in 1999, allowing for fewer injections (every 2 or 4 weeks instead of daily); however, the product was discontinued by Genentech/Alkermes in 2004 for financial reasons (Nutropin Depot required significantly more resources to produce than the rest of the Nutropin line).

== Analogues ==
Several growth hormone analogues featuring amino acid substitutions, deletions, and extensions have been developed, resulting in variants with distinct pharmacokinetic and pharmacodynamic profiles.

- HGH Fragment 176–191
- AOD9604
- Somatrem
- Somapacitan

== See also ==
- Acromegaly
- Somatopause
- Epigenetic clock
