= IGF-1 LR3 =

Synthetic protein

Clinical data
- Other names: Long R3-IGF-1; IGF-1 Long R3
- Routes of administration: Injection
- ATC code: None

Pharmacokinetic data
- Elimination half-life: 56-72 hours

Identifiers
- CAS Number: 143045-27-6
- ChemSpider: none
- UNII: M9L22Y19H9

Chemical and physical data
- Formula: C_{400}H_{625}N_{111}O_{115}S_{9}
- Molar mass: 9117.60 g·mol^{−1}

Long arginine 3-IGF-1, abbreviated as IGF-1 LR3 or LR3-IGF-1, is a synthetic protein and lengthened analogue of human insulin-like growth factor 1 (IGF-1). It differs from native IGF-1 in that it possesses an arginine instead of a glutamic acid at the third position in its amino acid sequence ("arginine 3"), and also has an additional 13 amino acids at its N-terminus (MFPAMPLLSLFVN) ("long"), for a total of 83 amino acids (relative to the 70 of IGF-1). The consequences of these modifications are that IGF-1 LR3 retains the pharmacological activity of IGF-1 as an agonist of the IGF-1 receptor, has very low affinity for the insulin-like growth factor-binding proteins (IGFBPs), and has improved metabolic stability. As a result, it is approximately three times more potent than IGF-1, and possesses a significantly longer half-life of about 20–30 hours (relative to IGF-1's half-life of about 12–15 hours).

The amino acid sequence of IGF-1 LR3 is MFPAMPLSSL FVNGPRTLCG AELVDALQFV CGDRGFYFNK PTGYGSSSRR APQTGIVDEC CFRSCDLRRL EMYCAPLKPA KSA.

== See also ==
- des(1-3)IGF-1
- Mecasermin
- Mecasermin rinfabate
- Insulin-like growth factor 2
- Growth hormone therapy
