= Des(1-3)IGF-1 =

Protein

Clinical data
- Routes of administration: Intravenous administration
- ATC code: None

Identifiers
- CAS Number: 112603-35-7
- ChemSpider: none
- UNII: AG0WVP88OA

Chemical and physical data
- Formula: C_{319}H_{501}N_{91}O_{96}S_{7}
- Molar mass: 7371.48 g·mol^{−1}

des(1-3)IGF-1 is a naturally occurring, endogenous protein, as well as drug, and truncated analogue of insulin-like growth factor 1 (IGF-1). des(1-3)IGF-1 lacks the first three amino acids at the N-terminus of IGF-1 (for a total of 67 amino acids, relative to the 70 of IGF-1). As a result of this difference, it has considerably reduced binding to the insulin-like growth factor-binding proteins (IGFBPs) and enhanced potency (about 10-fold in vivo) relative to IGF-1.

The amino acid sequence of des(1-3)IGF-1 is TLCGAELVDA LQFVCGDRGF YFNKPTGYGS SSRRAPQTGI VDECCFRSCD LRRLEMYCAP LKPAKSA.

== See also ==
- IGF-1 LR3
- Mecasermin
- Mecasermin rinfabate
- Insulin-like growth factor 2
