= LaRon =

LaRon, Laron, La'Ron or La'ron is a masculine given name and surname. Bearers include:

== Given name ==
- LaRon Bennett (born 1982), American sprinter and hurdler
- LaRon Byrd (born 1989), American National Football League player
- LaRon Dendy (born 1988), American basketball player
- LaRon Louis James (born 1982), stage name Juelz Santana, American rapper and member of East Coast hip hop group The Diplomats
- LaRon Landry (born 1984), American National Football League player
- Laron Profit (born 1977), American basketball coach and former player
- La'Ron Singletary (born 1979/80), American police chief
- Laron Williams (1949–1985), American serial killer

== Surname ==
- Kenneth La'ron (born 1997), stage name KennyHoopla, American singer, songwriter and musician
- Zvi Laron (born 1927), Israeli paediatric endocrinologist

== See also ==
- Laron syndrome, a medical disorder
