= Tercica =

А defunct biopharmaceutical company

Tercica, Inc.
- Industry: Health care
- Defunct: 2008
- Fate: Acquired by Ipsen Group
- Successor: Ipsen Biopharmaceuticals, Inc.
- Headquarters: Brisbane, California, United States

Tercica, Inc., was a biopharmaceutical company based in Brisbane, California, United States. It developed Increlex (mecasermin [rDNA origin] injection), also known as recombinant human Insulin-like Growth Factor-1 (rhIGF-1). Tercica applied to the Food and Drug Administration (FDA) for approval of Increlex as a long-term therapy for growth failure in children with severe primary IGF-1 deficiency (Primary IGFD), which is characterized by growth failure, and as a treatment for children with growth hormone (GH) gene deletion who have developed neutralizing antibodies to growth hormone.

Tercica licensed rights to develop, manufacture, and market Increlex from Genentech, Inc. Increlex conducted Phase III clinical trials to evaluate the safety and efficacy of Increlex in children with Primary IGFD.

In 2007, a case between Insmed and Tercica was settled when the jury found that Insmed infringed patents licensed to Tercica for Increlex. In the settlement, Insmed agreed to stop selling Iplex in the United States as a treatment for growth deficiencies and to withdraw an application to have the drug approved for such use in Europe.

In 2008, the Ipsen Group acquired Tercica and changed its name to Ipsen Biopharmaceuticals, Inc.

== See also ==
- Human growth hormone (HGH)
- IGF-1
