= Thomas Hutson =

American oncologist and cancer researcher

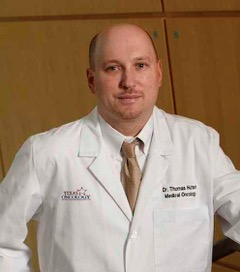
- Education: Ohio Northern University; Ohio University Heritage College of Medicine

Thomas E. Hutson is an American medical oncologist and cancer researcher based in Dallas, Texas. He is the director of Genitourinary Oncology Program and co-director of the Urologic Cancer Research and Treatment Center at Baylor University Medical Center. He is a Professor of Medicine at the Texas A&M Health Science Center College of Medicine and serves as a chair of Genitourinary Research for US Oncology and McKesson.

Most of Hutson’s research has been focused on using novel and targeted treatments for improving the outcome in patients with renal cell carcinoma. As an expert in his field, he has served as the principal investigator on several international clinical trials on novel therapies in renal cell carcinoma, bladder cancer, and prostate cancer. In addition, he has authored over 500 scholarly academic and research papers.

== Education ==
In 1993, Hutson completed his bachelor's degree in Pharmacy from the Ohio Northern University. He received his Doctor of Osteopathic Medicine (D.O.) degree from the Ohio University Heritage College of Osteopathic Medicine in 1997. And, in 2002 he received his Doctor of Pharmacy degree from Ohio Northern University.

== Career ==
In 1997, he joined the Cleveland Clinic Foundation to complete his internship and residency. Alongside a clinical fellowship in Hematology and Medical Oncology and a fellowship in Experimental Therapeutics, he joined the Ohio Northern University for Ph.D. in Pharmacy, which he completed in 2002.

Hutson became a Professor of Pharmacy at Raabe College of Pharmacy, Ohio Northern University in 2001 and taught there till 2008. In 2012, he joined Texas A&M Health Science Center College of Medicine as Professor of Medicine.

In 2006, he became the Chair and Medical Director at Genitourinary Research Committee at US Oncology Research and McKesson, a position where he served till 2015 when he became the Associate Chair of the Committee. In 2011, Hutson was appointed as the Co-Director of the Urologic Cancer Research and Treatment Center at Baylor’s Sammons Cancer Center.

In 2014, Hutson started religious studies at the Dallas Theological Seminary with a ministry focused on understanding the relationship between religion and medicine specifically focused on Christian Spirituality at End-of-life. He serves as a medical director for Holy Savior Hospice.

Hutson serves on the editorial boards of Clinical Prostate Cancer, Expert Review of Anticancer Therapy, Cancer.NET as well as Clinical Genitourinary Cancer. He is also the reviewer for several other journals including New England Journal of Medicine, The Lancet and Lancet Oncology. Since 2004, he has served on the Medical Advisory board of Kidney Cancer Association.

Hutson is a member of the American Society of Clinical Oncology, European Society of Medical Oncology, Society of Urologic Oncology, American Medical Association, American Society of Hematology, and the American College of Physicians. He is regularly invited speaker at medical conferences around the world.

== Awards ==
- 1992 - American Heart Association Research Fellowship
- 1997 - Basic Science Award, Ohio University College of Osteopathic Medicine
- 2002 - ECOG Young Investigators Award
- 2002 - CEC- Clinical Pharmacology of Anti-tumor Drugs
- 2005 - Fellow, American College of Physicians
- 2011 - D Magazine - Best Doctors: Oncology-Hematology

== Partial bibliography ==
- Initial management of metastatic disease. In: Management of Prostate Cancer, Second Edition. Humana Press. 2004.
- Cytokines in Renal Cell Cancer. In: Comprehensive Textbook of Genitourinary Oncology, Third Edition. Lippincott Williams and Wilkins. 2005.
- Carcinoma of Unknown Primary. In: Cancer in the Spine- Handbook of Comprehensive Care. Humana Press. 2006.
- Current Management of Bladder Cancer. Touch Briefings. 2006.
- Cytokines: Therapeutic Results and Molecular Basis of Activity. In: Renal Cell Carcinoma: Molecular Targets and Clinical Applications. Humana Press. 2007.
- Contemporary Therapeutic Strategies for Untreated Advanced RCC: A new paradigm. Medscape. 2008.
- New Science and Therapeutic Advances in the treatment of renal cell carcinoma: a case study review. Advance Studies in Medicine. 2008.
- Evolution of individualized patient care in metastatic kidney cancer. 2008.
- Everolimus for renal cell carcinoma: predictive factors for response and future directions. Medical Oncology Supplement. 2008.
- VEGF Pathway-Directed therapies in Renal Carcinoma. Emerging Cancer Therapeutics. Demos Medical Publishing. 2011.
