= John Kopchick =

American biologist

John J Kopchick
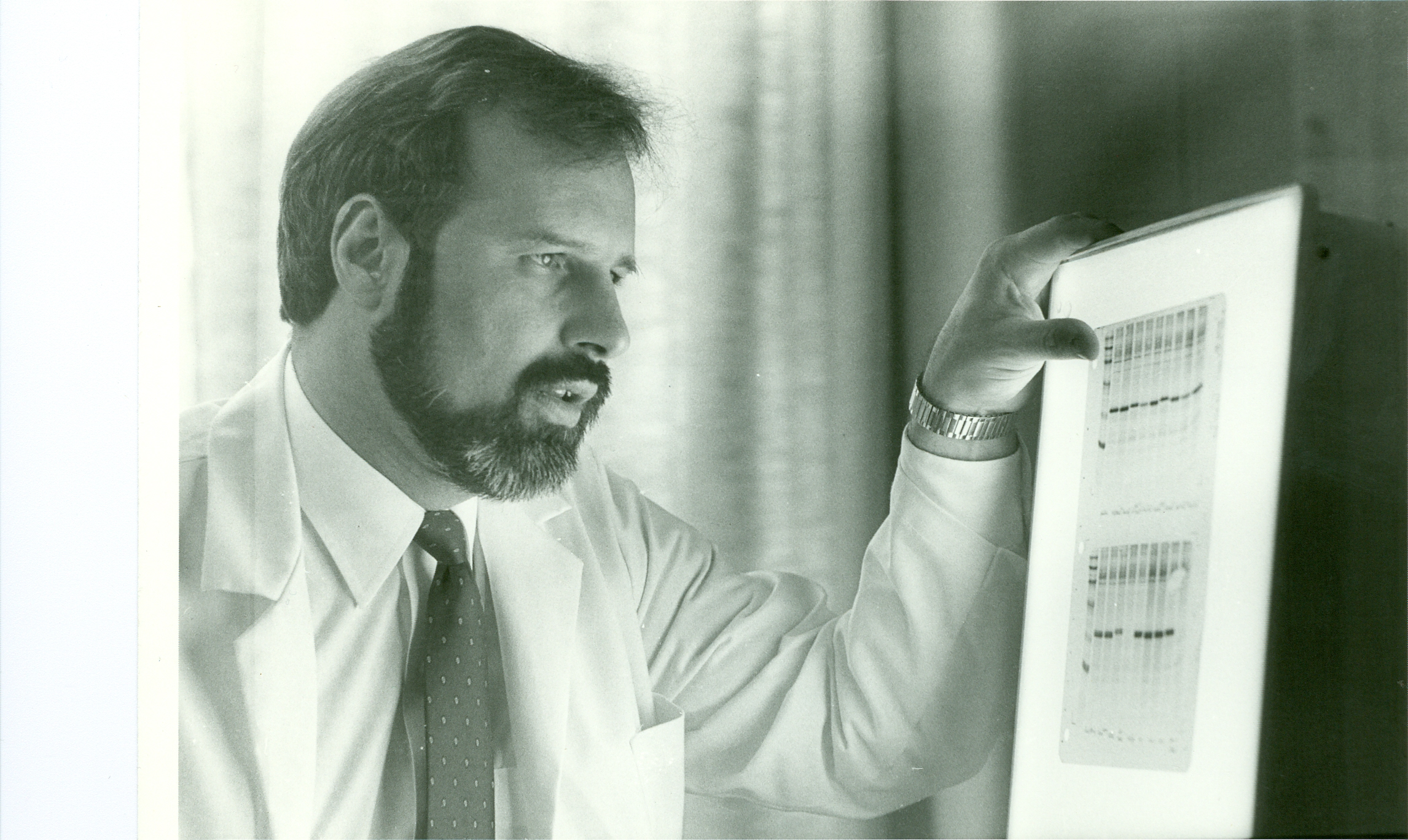
- Born: November 2, 1950 (age 75); Punxsutawney, Pennsylvania
- Education: Indiana University of Pennsylvania; University of Texas, MD Anderson
- Known for: Growth Hormone Research
- Awards: British Society for Endocrinology’s Transatlantic Medal (2011)
- Scientific career
- Fields: Biologist
- Workplaces: Ohio University

John Kopchick is a molecular biologist and co-inventor of the drug Somavert (Pegvisomant), which has improved the lives of acromegalic individuals around the world. He is currently the Goll-Ohio Eminent Scholar and Professor of Molecular Biology in the Department of Biomedical Sciences at the Ohio University Heritage College of Osteopathic Medicine. Dr. Kopchick's groundbreaking work in the field of growth hormone has helped shape the study of endocrinology.

== Early life ==
John Joseph Kopchick was born in Punxsutawney, Pennsylvania on November 2, 1950, to Peter Kopchick and Kathryn Gabster Kopchick and spent the first four years of his life living in the same town as the groundhog Punxsutawney Phil. The family then moved to a small coal-mining town: Ernest, Pennsylvania. His father and both grandfathers were coal-miners. He then moved to Indiana, Pennsylvania with his parents and youngest brother, Bill, where he attended Indiana High School. There, he varsity lettered in baseball, was in the national honor society, and played trumpet in the school band and orchestra. John later attended The Indiana University of Pennsylvania, where he met his wife, Charlene Kopchick. They were married on June 26, 1976.

== Education and career ==
John Kopchick
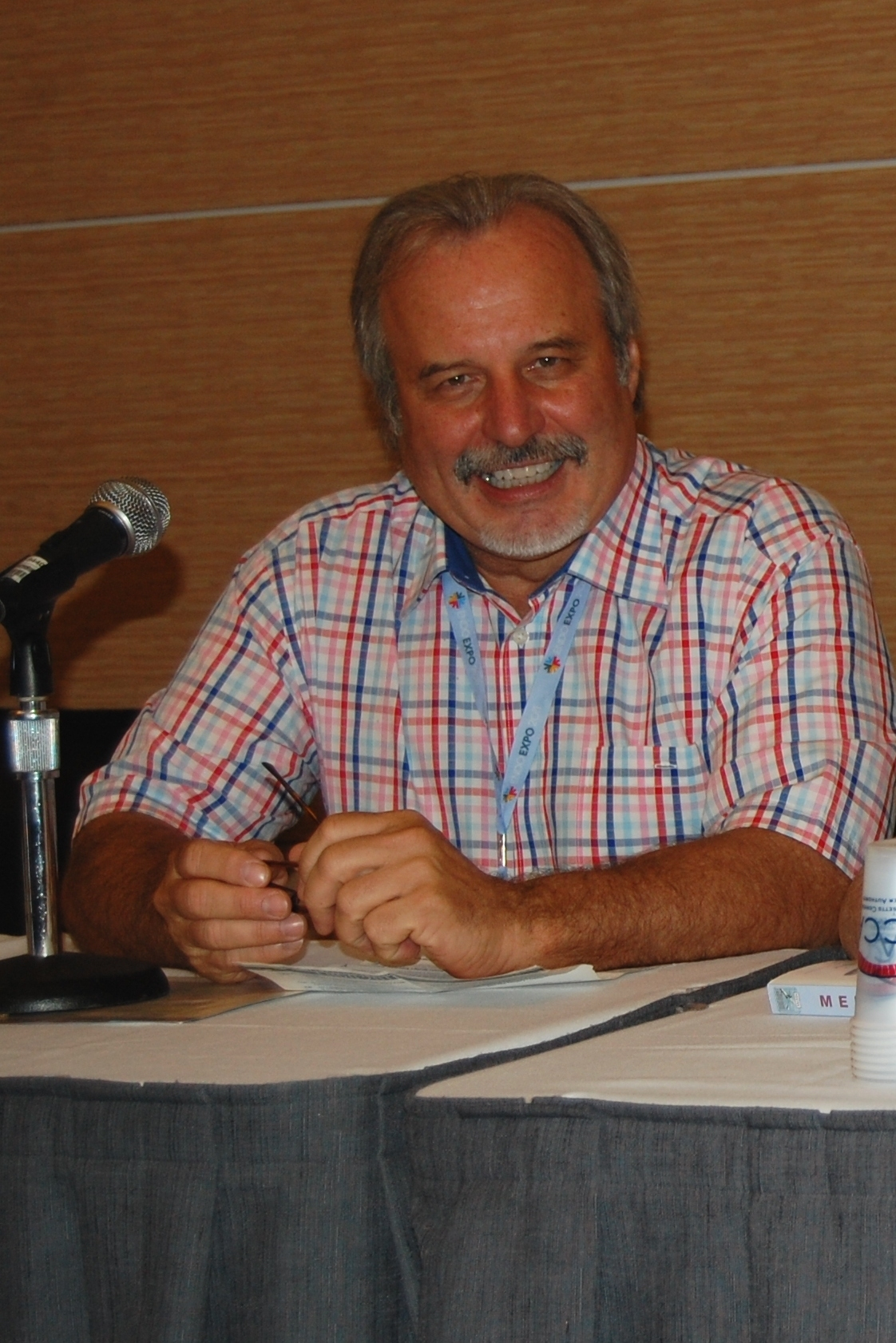
- John Kopchick moderating a session at The Endocrine Society's 93rd Annual Meeting, Boston 2011

Dr. Kopchick received his B.S. in biology in 1972 from the Indiana University of Pennsylvania (IUP). While attending IUP, he was a founding brother of a social fraternity Chi Alpha Sigma, which is now a chapter of Delta Tau Delta. In 1975, he received his M.S. in biology and chemistry from IUP. The title of his M.S. thesis was ‘Catabolism of alpha-amino adipate by Pseudomonas putida p2’. He went on to attend the University of Texas, Graduate School of Biomedical Sciences, MD Anderson Hospital, Houston, Texas and received his Ph.D. in 1980. His dissertation described the biosynthesis of Rauscher murine leukemia virus reverse transcriptase. From 1980 to 1982, he continued his research training as a postdoctoral fellow at the Roche Institute of Molecular Biology in Nutley, New Jersey. He then accepted a position at the prestigious Merck Institute of Therapeutic Research where he conducted and facilitated research from 1982 to 1986, first as a senior research biochemist and later as a research fellow, and finally as a group leader of Molecular Biology at the Department of Animal Drug Discovery. During that time, he developed a system built around cloning and expression of growth hormone (GH) genes.

In 1987, Dr. Kopchick started as Director of the Growth, Diabetes and Obesity section at the nascent Edison Biotechnology Institute (EBI) of Ohio University in Athens, Ohio. During his time at EBI, he discovered and characterized the molecular aspects of GH receptor antagonists. This discovery was further developed into the drug, Somavert(Pegvisomant for Injection). It has been approved worldwide for the treatment of patients with acromegaly, a chronic disease caused by excessive GH secretion. Royalties from the sales of Somavert has yielded ~$120M to Ohio University which has led to a Translational Medicine Doctoral Program. Another notable accomplishment of the Kopchick laboratory is the generation and characterization of the world's longest lived laboratory mouse, the growth hormone receptor knockout mouse. Dr. Kopchick has an h-index of 80, has advised more than 35 Ph.D., 14 M.S., 45 Post-doctoral fellows and over 350 undergraduate students. He has also published more than 400 scientific articles, issued 17 patents (11 patents pending) and serves or has served on the Editorial Boards of Endocrinology, Molecular Endocrinology, GH & IGF-1 Research, Pituitary, and The Journal of Biological Chemistry.

In 2022, a newly discovered dinosaur Yuxisaurus kopchicki was named after Dr. Kopchik in recognition of his contributions to biology and the IUP science building.

== The John and Char Kopchick Awards ==
In 2014, John and Char Kopchick committed to giving a $2 million donation to support scientific and medical research programs at Ohio University. The donation funds three newly established internal award programs at Ohio University, The John J. Kopchick Molecular and Cellular Biology (MCB)/Translational Biomedical Sciences (TBS) Faculty Support Fund, Research Fellowship Award and Undergraduate Student Support Fund. Also, the Kopchicks endorsed other two student oriented awards. In 2017, John and Char Kopchick gave a $10.5 million gift to fund up to 15 student fellowships at The University of Texas MD Anderson Cancer Center-UTHealth Graduate School of Biomedical Sciences. In 2018, John and Char Kopchick gave a $23 million gift to Indiana University of Pennsylvania for the construction of a new facility that will be the home of the College of Natural Sciences and Mathematics.

- In 1976–1980, he received the Roselie B. Hite Pre-doctoral Fellowship at Graduate School of Biomedical Sciences, University of Texas, Houston, Texas
- In 1980–1982, he received the American Cancer Society Postdoctoral Fellowship, at Roche Institute of Molecular, Biology, Nutley, New Jersey
- In 1987, Dr. Kopchick was awarded the Distinguished Alumni Award by Indiana University of Pennsylvania, Indiana, Pennsylvania
- In 1987, he received the Milton and Lawrence H. Goll Eminent Scholar Endowed Professorship in Molecular and Cellular Biology, Ohio University, Athens, Ohio
- In 2002, he was awarded the Distinguished Alumnus Award 2002 by the University of Texas M.D. Anderson Cancer Center, Houston, Texas
- In 2006, he was awarded the Distinguished Alumnus Award, 2006 by the Graduate School of Biomedical Sciences, University of Texas, Houston, Texas
- In 2007, he was awarded the AMVETS Silver Helmet Award, the highest award given by the AMVETS for service to the USA
- In 2007, he received the New York College of Osteopathic Medicine's Riland Award, an award given to individuals who have made outstanding contributions to medical science and education, health policy, public policy
- In 2008, he received the Honorary Doctor of Science Degree from Indiana University of Pennsylvania, Indiana, Pennsylvania
- In 2008, he gave the Commencement Address at Indiana University of Pennsylvania, Indiana, Pennsylvania
- In 2011, he was awarded the British Society for Endocrinology's Transatlantic Medal
- In 2012, he was named the 2012 Distinguished Professor at Ohio University
- In 2012, the Ohio University Heritage College of Osteopathic Medicine (OU-HCOM) announced The John J. Kopchick, Ph.D., Osteopathic Heritage Foundation Endowed Eminent Research Chair (see video announcement here)
- In 2012, he was elected president of Growth Hormone Research Society
- In 2013, he was elected To the National Academy of Inventors: Chartered Fellow
- In 2015, he received an honorary Doctor of Medicine. from Aarhus University in Denmark
- In 2017, the Heritage College of Osteopathic Medicine announced John J. Kopchick Distinguished Lecture Series
- In 2019, he was honored by the Endocrine Society with the prestigious Laureate Award for Outstanding Innovation

== Selected publications ==
- Chen, WY; Wight, DC; Wagner, TE; Kopchick, JJ (1990). "Expression of a mutated bovine growth hormone gene suppresses growth of transgenic mice". Proceedings of the National Academy of Sciences of the United States of America. 87 (13): 5061–5. Bibcode:1990PNAS...87.5061C. doi:10.1073/pnas.87.13.5061. PMC 54261. PMID 2367524.
- Chen, Wen Y.; Wight, David C.; Chen, Nian Y.; Coleman, Timothy A.; Wagner, Thomas E.; Kopchick, John J. (1991). "Mutations in the Third α-Helix of Bovine Growth Hormone Dramatically Affect Its Intracellular Distribution in Vitro and Growth Enhancement in Transgenic Mice". The Journal of Biological Chemistry. 266 (4): 2252–8. doi:10.1016/S0021-9258(18)52236-5. PMID 1989980.
- Zhou, Yihua; Xu, Bixiong C.; Maheshwari, Hiralal G.; He, Li; Reed, Michael; Lozykowski, Maria; Okada, Shigeru; Cataldo, Lori; Coschigamo, Karen; Wagner, Thomas E.; Baumann, Gerhard; Kopchick, John J. (1997). "A mammalian model for Laron syndrome produced by targeted disruption of the mouse growth hormone receptor/binding protein gene (the Laron mouse)". Proceedings of the National Academy of Sciences. 94 (24): 13215–20. Bibcode:1997PNAS...9413215Z. doi:10.1073/pnas.94.24.13215. JSTOR 43567. PMC 24289. PMID 9371826.
- Berryman, Darlene E.; Christiansen, Jens Sandahl; Johannsson, Gudmundur; Thorner, Michael O.; Kopchick, John J. (2008). "Role of the GH/IGF-1 axis in lifespan and healthspan: Lessons from animal models". Growth Hormone & IGF Research. 18 (6): 455–71. doi:10.1016/j.ghir.2008.05.005. PMC 2631405. PMID 18710818.
- List, Edward O.; Sackmann-Sala, Lucila; Berryman, Darlene E.; Funk, Kevin; Kelder, Bruce; Gosney, Elahu S.; Okada, Shigeru; Ding, Juan; Cruz-Topete, Diana; Kopchick, John J. (2010). "Endocrine Parameters and Phenotypes of the Growth Hormone Receptor Gene Disrupted (GHR-/-) Mouse". Endocrine Reviews. 32 (3): 356–86. doi:10.1210/er.2010-0009. PMC 3365798. PMID 21123740.
- Junnila, R. K., Duran-Ortiz, S., Suer, O., Sustarsic, E. G., Berryman, D. E., List, E. O., & Kopchick, J. J. (2016). Disruption of the GH Receptor Gene in Adult Mice Increases Maximal Lifespan in Females. Endocrinology, 157(12), 4502–4513. https://doi.org/10.1210/en.2016-1649.
- Basu, R., Qian, Y., & Kopchick, J. J. (2018). MECHANISMS IN ENDOCRINOLOGY: Lessons from growth hormone receptor gene-disrupted mice: are there benefits of endocrine defects?. European journal of endocrinology, 178(5), R155–R181. https://doi.org/10.1530/EJE-18-0018.
- Junnila, R. K., List, E. O., Berryman, D. E., Murrey, J. W., & Kopchick, J. J. (2013). The GH/IGF-1 axis in ageing and longevity. Nature reviews. Endocrinology, 9(6), 366–376. https://doi.org/10.1038/nrendo.2013.67.
