= Heritage College of Osteopathic Medicine =

Osteopathic medical school of Ohio University

Heritage College of Osteopathic Medicine at Ohio University
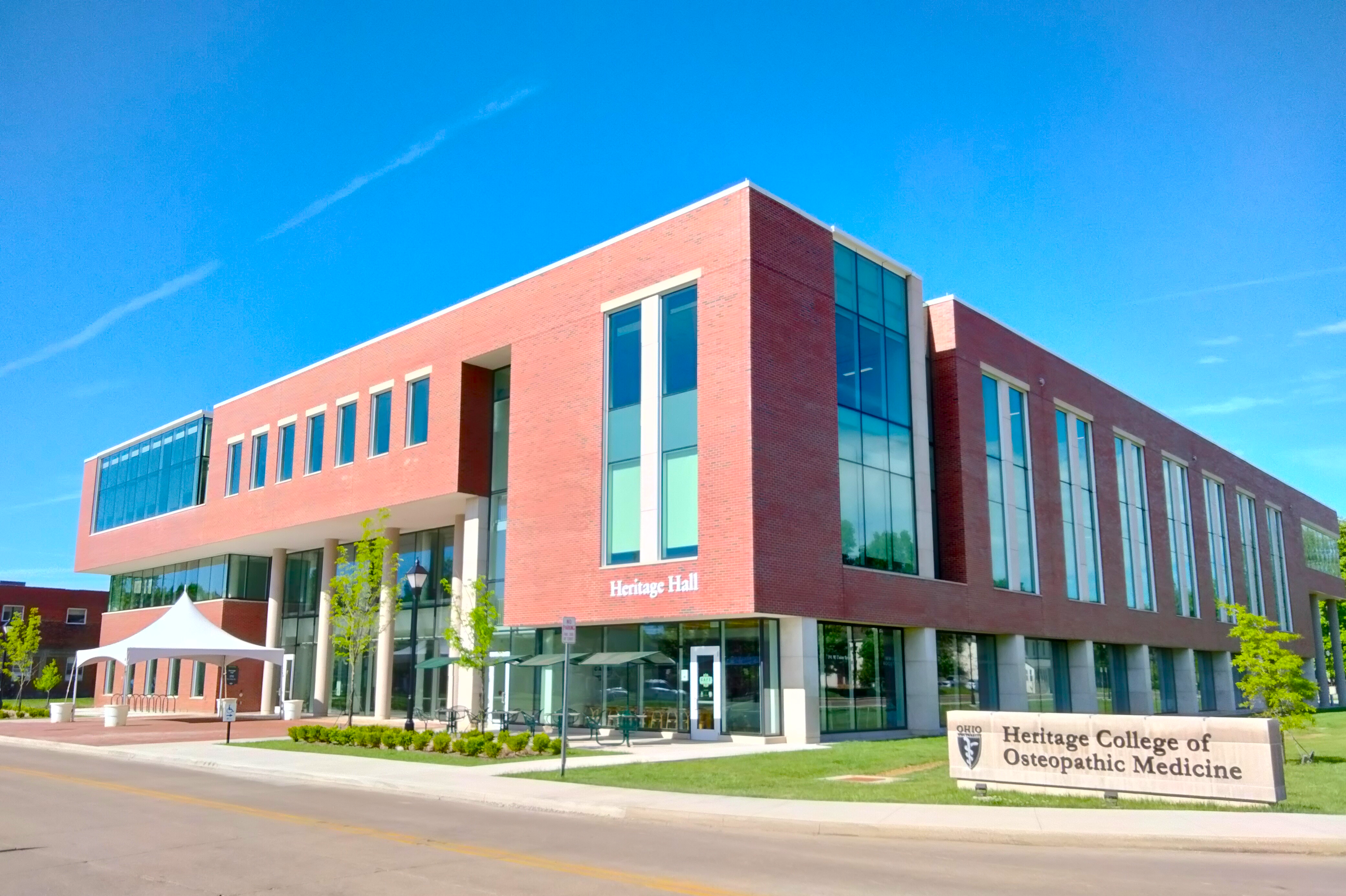
- Type: Public
- Established: 1975
- Endowment: $18.0 million
- Budget: $105 million
- Dean: Kenneth H. Johnson, D.O.
- Academic staff: 142
- Doctoral students: 1,001
- Location: Athens, Ohio, Cleveland, Ohio, and Dublin, Ohio, U.S. 39.3379°N 82.0956°W
- Campus: Rural, urban
- Mascots: Ostie the Osteopathic Owl and Rufus the Bobcat
- Website: www.ohio.edu/medicine

The Heritage College of Osteopathic Medicine (OU-HCOM) is the medical school of Ohio University, the largest medical school in Ohio, and the only osteopathic medical school in the state. Heritage is ranked in the Top 50 U.S. medical schools for primary care.

== Mission and impact ==
The mission of the Heritage College is to emphasize the practice of primary care and train physicians to serve Ohio, especially in the underserved Appalachian and urban areas of the state. Heritage offers a single program conferring the degree Doctor of Osteopathic Medicine (D.O.), and several combined degree programs. Graduates are eligible to practice medicine in all 50 states and more than 50 countries. The college is fully accredited by the American Osteopathic Association's Commission on Osteopathic College Accreditation, and by the Institutions of Higher Education of the North Central Association of Colleges and Schools. The World Directory of Medical Schools lists the school as a US medical school along with other accredited US MD and DO programs.

=== Impact ===
"Southeast Ohio is the beneficiary of roughly $63 million in social and economic gains from the Ohio University Heritage College of Osteopathic Medicine's health services and clinics, most of which are free, according to a recent social return on investment analysis of the college's Community Health Programs (CHP)."

== History ==
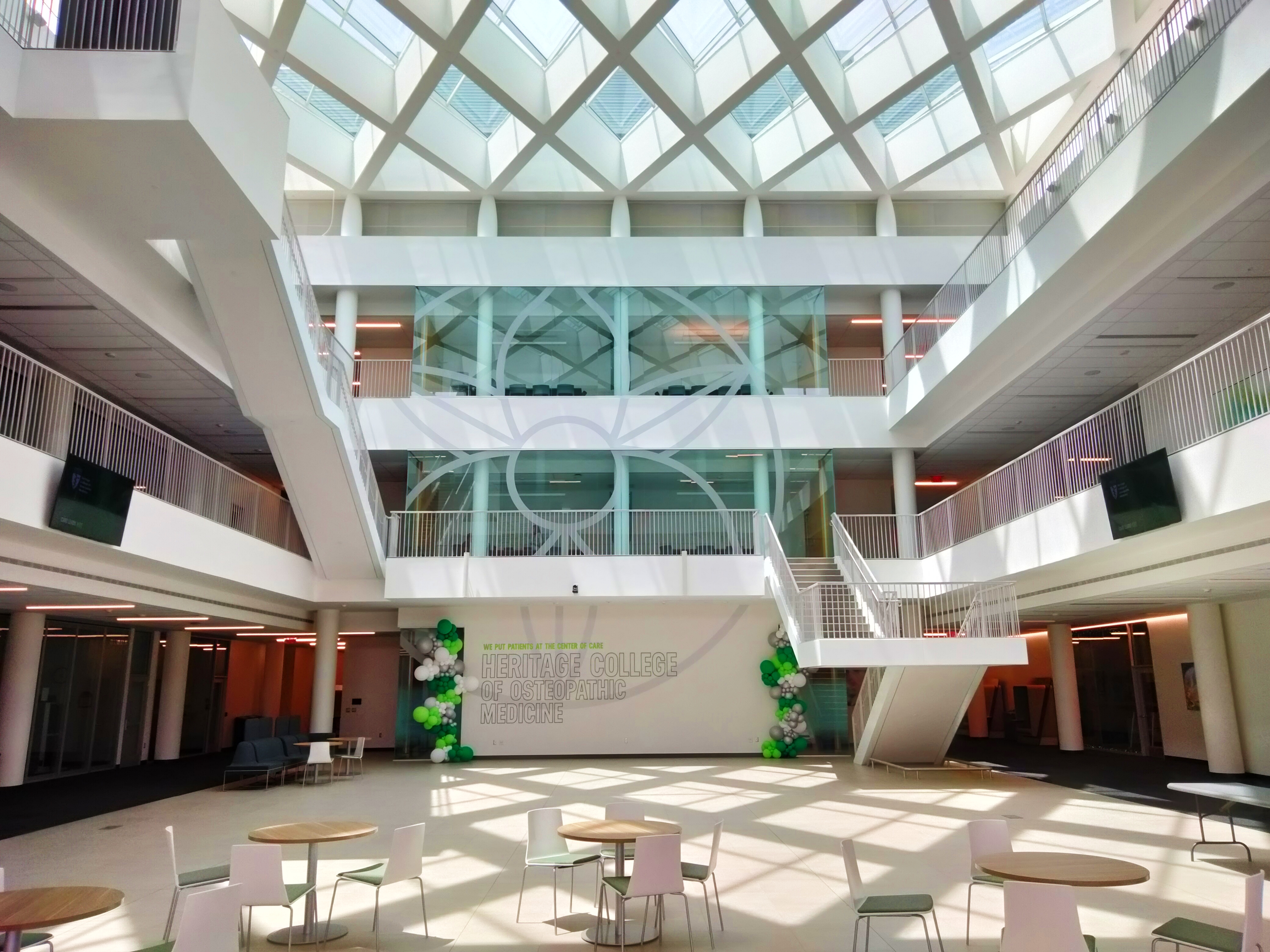
Heritage Hall, the seat of the college, opened 2021.

In 1823, the board of trustees of Ohio University passed a resolution forming a committee to "take into consideration the expediency of establishing a Medical School". Early in the state's history, Athens was chosen as a suitable location. More than 150 years later, the college was established in 1975 to award the Doctor of Osteopathic Medicine (D.O.) degree, and its first class was made up of 21 graduates. The college has since expanded, and as of the 2023-2024 academic year, there were 1001 students enrolled.

In 1989, John Kopchick, Ph.D., an endocrinologist and the Goll-Ohio Eminent Scholar and Professor of Molecular Biology at the Heritage College, discovered a compound that would go on to become Pegvisomant (Somavert), a growth hormone receptor antagonist used to treat acromegaly. The team's discovery awarded Kopchick and Ohio University a number of U.S. and European patents and has since been marketed by Pfizer, earning the university more than $120 million in royalties from the license.

In 1993, Barbara Ross-Lee, D.O., was appointed to the position of dean of the Heritage College of Osteopathic Medicine; she was the first African-American woman to serve as the dean of a U.S. medical school.

In 2011, the Heritage College of Osteopathic Medicine gained renown for receiving $105 million from the Osteopathic Heritage Foundations, the largest private gift ever given to Ohio University. Shortly after, the college began creating two new extension campuses, one in partnership with OhioHealth in Dublin, Ohio, and one in partnership with Cleveland Clinic in Cleveland, Ohio. In December 2012, the college received approval from the Commission on Osteopathic College Accreditation (COCA), the accrediting agency for osteopathic medical schools, to begin recruiting students for its Central Ohio Extension Campus in Dublin, Ohio. The charter class of 50 medical students began classes in July 2014. In July 2015, the first class of 50 students are expected to begin at the Cleveland Clinic's campus at South Pointe Hospital.

== Campuses ==
Heritage College's main medical campus is located on Union Street Green inside the main Ohio University campus in Athens, Ohio.

In 2014, alongside pre-eminent training partner OhioHealth, the college opened a second medical school campus in Dublin, Ohio. In 2015, the college opened a third campus in affiliation with Cleveland Clinic at Cleveland Clinic South Pointe Hospital in Warrensville Heights, Ohio. Approximately 120 medical students train at the Athens campus, 70 in Dublin and 60 in Cleveland.

After many years on the West Green, fundraising allowed Heritage Hall to be constructed along Union Street (near West Green), opening in 2021. This new area of campus will be referred to as Union Green. In 2023, the university announced a $70 million funding commitment from the Osteopathic Heritage Foundation to construct a large adjacent hall which will be used for practice. The Heritage medical campus is located near O'Bleness Hospital in Athens which is operated by OhioHealth.

Heritage's two campuses in addition to Athens are:

- Dublin, which includes an extension campus in addition to a medical campus, and
- Cleveland, which is affiliated with the Cleveland Clinic.

== Admissions and academics ==
The Heritage College is ranked in the Top 50 U.S. medical schools for primary care. The school is the largest medical school in the state of Ohio. As of Autumn 2023, there are a total of 1,001 students enrolled across all three campuses for the 2023-2024 academic year: Athens- 473, Cleveland- 245, Dublin- 283. Admissions are considered competitive and holistic. As a state-funded medical school, HCOM gives strong preference for applicants who are in-state residents. For the entering class of 2022, the average science GPA was 3.62; non-science, 3.77; and overall, 3.68. The average MCAT score was 504.50, with a range of 490 to 520. For the entering class of 2027, the average undergraduate overall GPA was 3.66. The average MCAT score was 503.44. Out of 4879 applicants, 260 students matriculated into the Class of 2027.

There are two curricular tracks available to medical students during their first and second year of medical school: the Clinical Presentation Continuum (CPC) and the Patient-Centered Continuum (PCC). Students enrolled in the more traditional CPC study a curriculum organized around important symptoms and take part in extensive lectures, problem sets and panel discussions. Students in PCC spend more time in clinical and community experiences learning patient interviewing skills, with an emphasis on student-defined learning objectives. During years three and four, students enter one of 29 available teaching hospitals within the Centers for Osteopathic Research and Education (CORE), a statewide medical education consortium founded by the college.

Several combined degree programs are available as well, including:

- D.O./M.P.H.
- D.O./M.H.A.
- D.O./M.B.A.
- D.O./Ph.D.

== People ==
=== Deans ===
- Kenneth H. Johnson, D.O. – 2012–present
- John "Jack" Adolph Brose, D.O. – 2001–2012
- Daniel Jon Marazon, D.O. – 2001
- Barbara Ross-Lee, D.O. – 1993–2000
- Frank Wayne Myers, D.O. – 1977–1993
- Gerald Alden Faverman, Ph.D. – 1975–1977

=== Alumni ===
- Robert Biscup, D.O. 1980
- Terry Johnson (Ohio politician), D.O. 1991
- Thomas Hutson, D.O. 1997

=== Faculty ===
- John Kopchick, Ph.D.

== See also ==
- OhioHealth
- Cleveland Clinic
- History of Ohio University
- List of Medical Schools in the United States
- Ohio University Russ College of Engineering and Technology
