= Isolated growth hormone deficiency =

- Other names: Isolated congenital growth hormone deficiency, Familial isolated growth hormone deficiency.
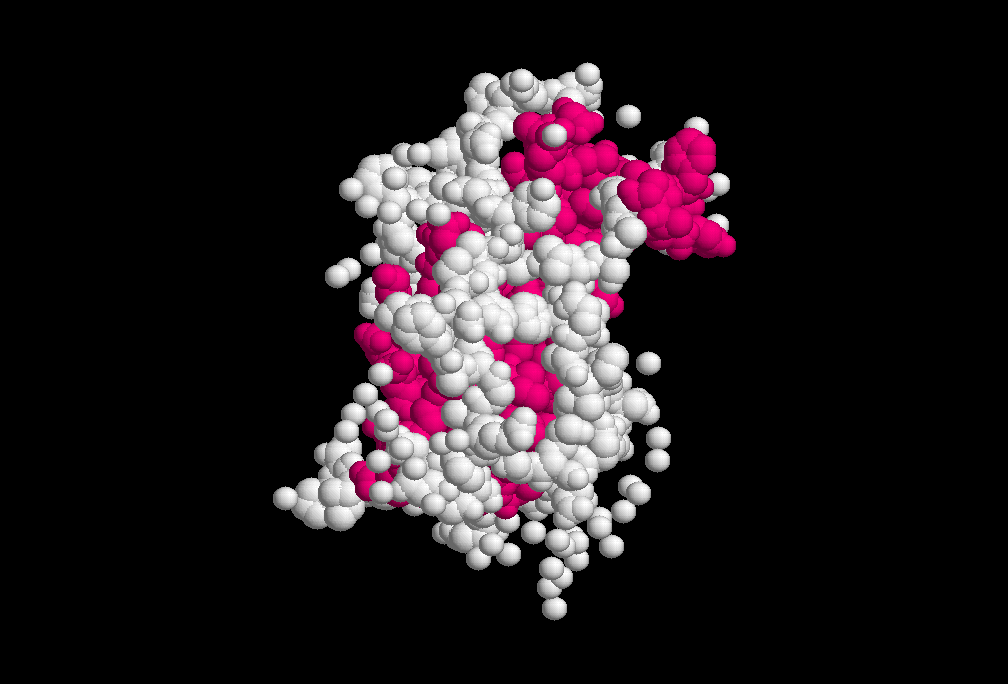
- Growth hormone
- Specialty: Endocrinology

Isolated growth hormone deficiency (IGHD) is a rare congenital disorder characterized by growth hormone deficiency and postnatal growth failure. It is divided into four subtypes that vary in terms of cause and clinical presentation. They include IGHD IA (autosomal recessive, absent GH), IGHD IB (autosomal recessive, diminished GH), IGHD II (autosomal dominant, diminished GH), and IGHD III (X-linked, diminished GH).

== Signs and symptoms ==
Babies diagnosed with type IA are shorter than average at birth, which is a clear sign of growth failure.

Short stature is a characteristic of type IB, yet this development failure is usually not as severe as in type IA. People with type IB typically exhibit growth failure in their early to mid-childhood years.

Individuals suffering with isolated growth hormone deficiency type II exhibit variable degrees of short height and extremely low growth hormone levels. These people typically exhibit growth failure in their early to mid-childhood years.

Similar to type II isolated growth hormone deficiency, type III is characterized by extremely low growth hormone levels and variable degrees of short height in the affected individuals. Type III growth failure typically manifests in early to mid-childhood. Individuals who have type III may also be more susceptible to infections and have a compromised immune system.

== Causes ==
While the majority of isolated growth hormone deficiency cases are sporadic and assumed to be caused by hypothalamic or pituitary injuries in utero, during or after birth, anatomic abnormalities are discovered in just 12% of such patients who undergo magnetic resonance imaging (MRI).

Many children with isolated growth hormone deficiency are known as having idiopathic growth hormone deficiency or idiopathic isolated growth hormone deficiency since in most cases, there is no known etiology for the condition.

=== Genetics ===
Genes encoding growth hormone (GH1) or the growth-hormone-releasing hormone receptor (GHRHR) have been linked to the pathogenesis of isolated growth hormone insufficiency. However, there have not yet been any reports of GHRH mutations. Rarely, heterozygous mutations in SOX3 or HESX13 might cause an isolated growth hormone deficit.

== Diagnosis ==
The diagnosis of growth hormone deficiency is a multi-step procedure that involves pituitary MRI, biochemical testing (growth hormone stimulation tests and measurement of IGF-1/IGFBP3), clinical and auxological examination, and genetic test results.

=== Classification ===
Four different forms of familial isolated growth hormone deficiency have been identified: X-linked recessive (type III), autosomal dominant (type II), and autosomal recessive (type IA and IB).
