= Laron syndrome =

- Other names: genetic pituitary dwarfism (1966), Laron dwarfism (1973), Laron-type dwarfism (1984), growth hormone insensitivity (1994), hereditary somatomedin deficiency, growth hormone receptor deficiency (GHRD)(1999)
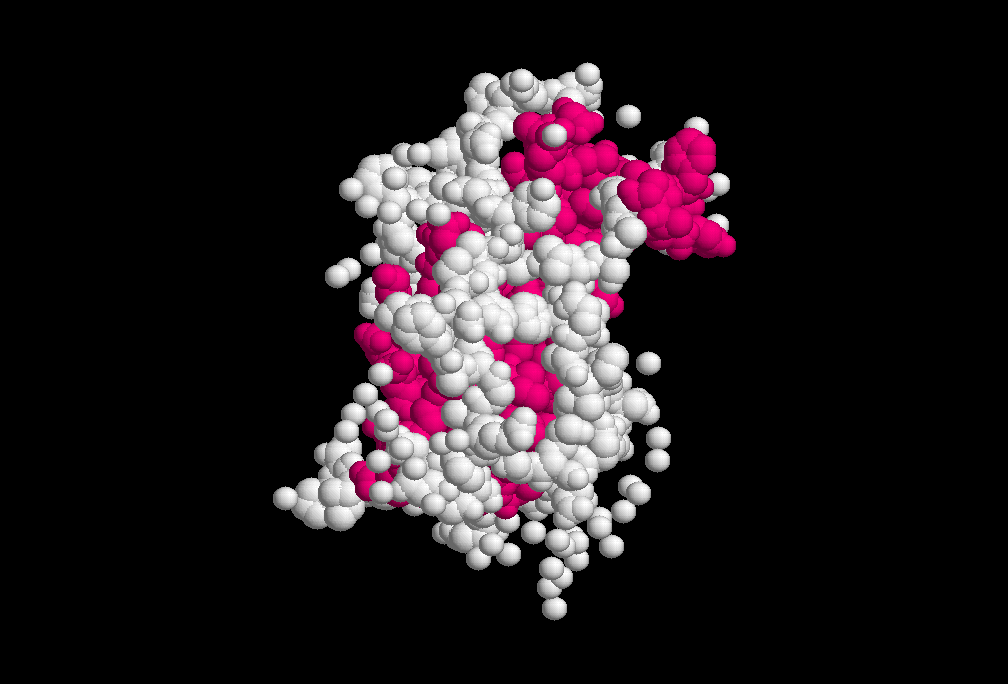
- Growth hormone
- Specialty: Endocrinology, Medical Genetics, Pediatrics
- Symptoms: Short stature, truncal obesity, facial dysmorphism
- Usual onset: Present at birth
- Duration: Lifelong
- Causes: Autosomal recessive growth hormone receptor gene mutation (chromosome 5)
- Risk factors: Hypoglycemia, seizures, reduced intellectual capacity, osteopenia
- Differential diagnosis: STAT5b, IGF1 gene mutation, ALS deficiency, IGF-1 receptor mutation, familial short stature, malnutrition, hepatic disease, congenital growth delay, hypopituitarism
- Treatment: IGF-1, Mecasermin
- Frequency: 1–9 / 1,000,000 (approximately 250 known cases worldwide)

Laron syndrome (LS), also known as growth hormone insensitivity or growth hormone receptor deficiency (GHRD), is an autosomal recessive disorder characterized by a lack of insulin-like growth factor 1 (IGF-1; somatomedin-C) production in response to growth hormone (GH; hGH; somatotropin). It is usually caused by inherited growth hormone receptor (GHR) mutations. The syndrome is named after the scientist Zvi Laron who first discovered the syndrome in 1966.

Affected individuals classically present with short stature between −4 and −10 standard deviations below median height, obesity, craniofacial abnormalities, micropenis, low blood sugar, and low serum IGF-1 despite elevated basal serum GH.

LS is a very rare condition with a total of 250 known individuals worldwide. The genetic origins of these individuals have been traced back to Mediterranean, South Asian, and Semitic ancestors, with the latter group comprising the majority of cases. Molecular genetic testing for growth hormone receptor gene mutations confirms the diagnosis of LS, but clinical evaluation may include laboratory analysis of basal GH, IGF-1 and IGFBP levels, GH stimulation testing, and/or GH trial therapy.

People with LS are unresponsive to growth hormone therapy; the disease is instead treated mainly with recombinant IGF-1, Mecasermin.

Evidence has suggested that people with Laron syndrome have a reduced risk of developing cancer and diabetes mellitus type II, with a significantly reduced incidence and delayed age of onset of these diseases compared to their unaffected relatives. The molecular mechanisms of increased longevity and protection from age-related disease among people with LS is an area of active investigation.

== Presentation ==
=== Physical features ===
LS is recognized as being part of a spectrum of conditions that affect the Hypothalamic–pituitary–somatotropic axis and cause significant derangements in human growth, development, and metabolism. Along this spectrum of conditions, individuals with LS and growth hormone deficiency display short stature, while individuals with acromegaly and gigantism result in the opposite phenotype of tall stature.

In addition to short stature, other characteristic physical symptoms of LS include: prominent forehead, depressed nasal bridge, underdevelopment of mandible, truncal obesity, and micropenis in males. Left untreated, the average height attained by individuals with LS are approximately 4–4.5 feet (1.2–1.4 m) in women/men respectively. Additional physical features include delayed bone age, hypogonadism, blue sclera, high-pitched voice, acrohypoplasia, sparse hair growth, and crowded teeth. The breasts of females reach normal size, and in some are large in relation to body size. It has been suggested that hyperprolactinemia may contribute to the enlarged breast size. Seizures are frequently seen secondary to hypoglycemia. Some genetic variations decrease intellectual capacity. Laron syndrome patients also do not develop acne, except temporarily during treatment with IGF-1 (if performed).

== Pathophysiology ==
Laron syndrome has an autosomal recessive pattern of inheritance.

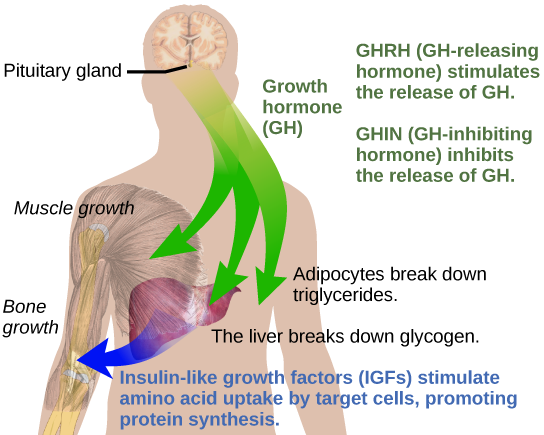

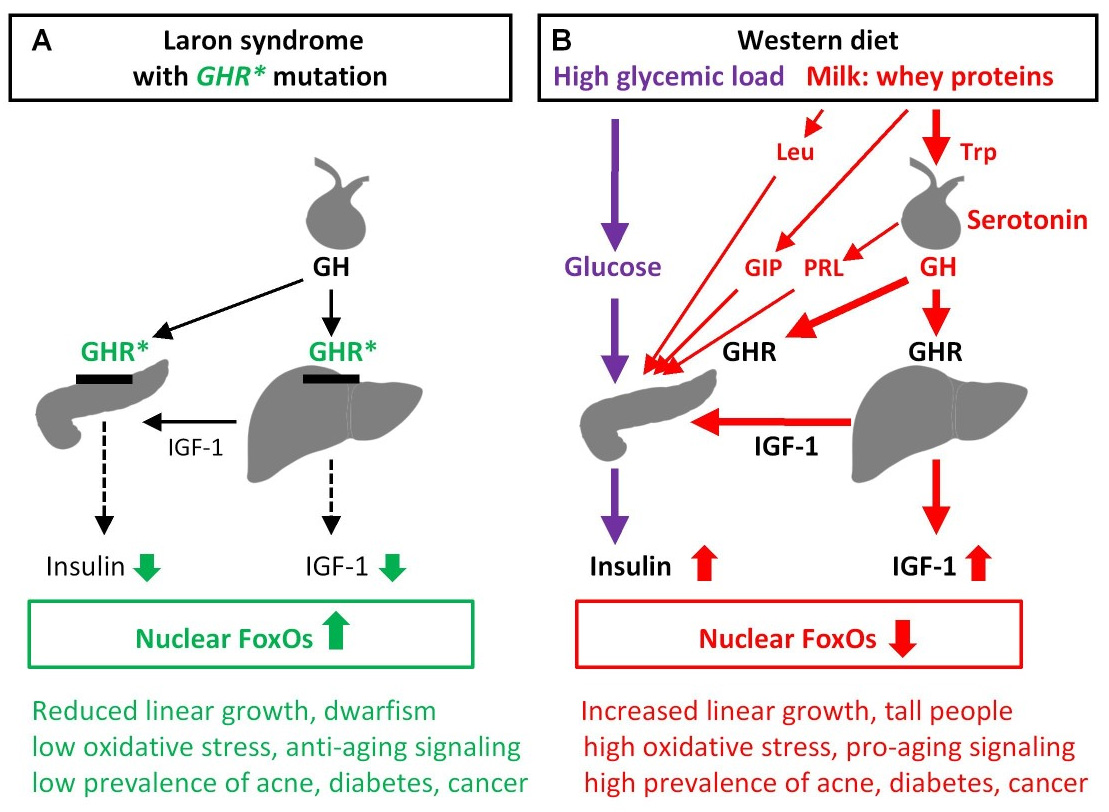
Impact of insulin/IGF-1 signaling in Laron syndrome (A) and Western diet (B) on FoxO-mediated gene regulation and associated pathologies. GHR*, growth hormone receptor loss of function mutation in Laron syndrome; GIP, glucose-dependent insulinotropic polypeptide, a whey protein-induced incretin, which stimulates β-cell proliferation and insulin secretion; PRL, prolactin; PRL secretion is induced by serotonergic hypothalamic signaling; Trp, tryptophan, and Leu, leucine, essential amino acids enriched in the whey protein α-lactalbumin; Trp via serotonin synthesis stimulates pituitary GH and PRL secretion and Leu stimulates β-cell proliferation and insulin secretion.

Under normal circumstances in humans, growth hormone (GH) is released in a pulsatile fashion from cells known as somatotrophs in the anterior pituitary gland. These pulses of GH are regulated by cells in the hypothalamus, via the release of growth hormone-releasing hormone (GHRH) into the hypothalamohypophysial system when stimulated by insulin, ghrelin, glucagon, arginine, deep sleep, exercise, fasting, sex hormone release during puberty, and a host of other factors. GH release is inhibited by somatostatin (GHIH), IGF-1, hyperglycemia, and glucocorticoids. Once released, the GH molecules travel through the bloodstream and eventually bind to GH receptors on the surface of cells composing bodily organs and tissues. One major site of action for GH is in the liver, where it stimulates gluconeogenesis and the release of IGF-1 through the JAK-STAT signaling pathway. IGF-1 promotes growth in a variety of tissues throughout the body, especially bone mineralization, and provides negative feedback on GH release. GH results in increased muscle mass, lipolysis, and protein synthesis. Obesity and increased adipose tissue, especially visceral fat, results in reduced GH secretion. There is a natural age-related decline in the GHRH-stimulated release of GH.

=== Growth hormone receptor mutations ===
Molecular genetic investigations have shown that LS is mainly associated with autosomal recessive mutations in the gene for the growth hormone receptor (GHR). These can result in defective hormone binding to the ectodomain or reduced efficiency of dimerization of the receptor after hormone occupancy.

LS is generally classified as "primary" GH insensitivity, which is distinguished from "secondary" GH insensitivity. Primary (congenital/hereditary) GH insensitivity may result from growth hormone receptor defects, as in the case of Laron syndrome, but can also be caused by defective post-receptor signal transduction (STAT5B), abnormalities of the IGF-1 gene or IGF-1 receptor. Secondary (acquired) GH insensitivity results from antibodies to growth hormone or the growth hormone receptor, as well as poor nutritional status, liver disease or diabetes mellitus. A GHR mutation that results in only partial insensitivity to GH can manifest as a form of idiopathic short stature.

=== STAT5B ===
A related condition involving postreceptor insensitivity to growth hormone has been associated with STAT5B.

== Diagnosis ==
LS should be suspected in children or adults with distinctive physical features listed above, extremely elevated serum hGH concentrations despite low serum IGF-1 levels. A failure of IGF-1 to increase in response to exogenous hGH (IGF-1 stimulation test) is diagnostic for LS. The gold standard for confirming a diagnosis of LS is to perform a genetic analysis with PCR to identify the precise molecular defect in the GH receptor gene. Other laboratory abnormalities include GHBP (growth hormone binding protein) levels being low in cases with mutations in the extracellular domain of the GH receptor and normal in cases with mutations in the intracellular domain. Low serum levels of IGFBP are non-diagnostic for LS.

== Treatment ==
Administration of recombinant GH has no effect on IGF-1 production, therefore it is ineffective for the treatment of Laron syndrome. Instead, it is treated mainly by recombinant IGF-1. IGF-1 must be taken before puberty to be effective.

The drug product Increlex (mecasermin), developed by the company Tercica, purchased by Ipsen, was approved by the US Food and Drug Administration in August 2005 for replacing IGF-1 in patients who are deficient.

IPLEX (Mecasermin rinfabate) is composed of recombinant human IGF-1 (rhIGF-1) and its binding protein IGFBP-3. It was approved by the U.S. Food and Drug Administration (FDA) in 2005 for treatment of primary IGF-1 deficiency or GH gene deletion. Side effects from IPLEX are hypoglycemia. IPLEX's manufacturing company, Insmed, after selling its protein production facility, can no longer develop proteins, thus can no longer manufacture IPLEX as of a statement released in July 2009.

== Prognosis ==
=== Cancer and diabetes ===
It has been reported that people with LS in Ecuador are resistant to cancer and diabetes and are somewhat protected against aging. This is consistent with findings in mice with a defective growth hormone receptor gene. Among the approximately 100 individuals in this population, there were no reported cases of diabetes and one case of cancer.

A 2019 study of individuals with isolated growth hormone deficiency (IGHD type 1B) in Itabaianinha County, Brazil, demonstrated a phenotype consistent with Laron syndrome. Researchers found that these humans had similarly extended healthspan, with resistance to cancer and attenuated effects of aging, but neither patients with LS nor IGHD experienced an increase in their overall lifespan.

Recent studies indicate that individuals with Laron syndrome exhibit significantly lower rates of cancer and enhanced metabolic health, likely as a result of reduced insulin-like growth factor 1 (IGF-1) activity, which decreases cell proliferation and activation of cancer-related pathways.

== Incidence ==
Numerous Laron syndrome patients are found in Israel among the country's diverse Jewish population composed of Jews from around the world, as well as patients outside Israel originally from communities of the Jewish diaspora, such as Egypt and Iraq. The original "Israeli cohort" of patients referred to Zvi Laron and colleagues beginning in 1958 consisted of 64 patients as of 2009, including 4 deceased patients. The countries of origin of these patients include Israel, Palestine, Jordan, Lebanon, Iran, Malta, Italy, Argentina, Ecuador, and Peru.

A disproportionate number of people with the condition are found in remote villages in the Loja province of Ecuador. These individuals are descended from colonial-era Jewish-origin New Christian conversos (Sephardi Jews who themselves, or whose forebears, had been compelled to convert to Catholicism back in Spain) who had covertly migrated to Ecuador during the Spanish Conquest despite the Spanish Crown's prohibition of their emigration to its colonies and territories as a result of the Inquisition.

Other patients include people of other Semitic non-Jewish origins, including from Saudi Arabia, Japan, and China.

=== Homo floresiensis ===
Recent publications have proposed that Homo floresiensis represented a population with widespread Laron syndrome, based upon the many similarities of skeletal remains found in Indonesia with LS. This is only one of several competing hypotheses, and has received criticism as insufficient to explain the "range features observed in H. floresiensis". Similar postulates have been proposed regarding the Pygmies of Central Africa.

== History ==
Israeli pediatric endocrinologist Zvi Laron, along with Athalia Pertzelan, Avinoam Galatzer, Liora Kornreich, Dalia Peled, Rivka Kauli, and Beatrice Klinger published the earliest clinical studies of individuals with LS beginning in 1966. Among their first 22 patients, Laron and colleagues noted consanguineous genealogy of Israeli and Palestinian ancestry with distinct physical characteristics resembling hypopituitarism. However, researchers noticed that these people had high serum GH levels, which are expected to be low in patients with hypopituitarism. Successive studies carried out over the subsequent 20 years by Laron and colleagues revealed an absence of IGF-1 release in response to exogenous hGH and an absence of GH binding to liver cell membranes in this group of patients. The results of these studies provided clear evidence that the pathogenicity of the disease was the result of GH receptor failure in the liver.

== See also ==
- Hypothalamic–pituitary–somatic axis
