= Robert Biscup =

American orthopaedic surgeon

Robert S. Biscup
- Born: June 4, 1952; Cleveland
- Education: Hiram College, Case Western Reserve University, Ohio University
- Known for: Treating Degenerative disc disease, Spinal disc herniation, Spondylolisthesis, bulging disc, spinal stenosis, herniated disc and many other therapies and minimally invasive surgical techniques to improve mobility and quality of life.
- Scientific career
- Fields: Orthopaedic surgeon

Robert S. Biscup (born June 4, 1952) is an American orthopaedic surgeon.

Biscup's work includes developments in major reconstructive spine surgery, failed spine surgery, and minimally invasive spine surgery, including laser microsurgery and micro-decompression laminoplasty. Biscup lectures frequently in Florida and around the world.

== Background ==
Robert S. Biscup was born in Cleveland, Ohio to George and Betty Biscup. He grew up in Cleveland, where at age 10 he began to play the accordion, piano, and organ. He played professionally to help pay for his college education at Hiram College, where he received a Bachelor of Arts Degree in 1967. Dr. Biscup graduated cum laude with Departmental Honors in Chemistry from Hiram College with a Bachelor of Arts degree. Biscup also earned a Master of Science in Health Sciences Education at Case Western Reserve University and completed his Doctor of Osteopathic Medicine degree (D.O.) at the Ohio University College of Osteopathic Medicine in 1980.

== Career ==
A former president and current member of the American Osteopathic Academy of Orthopaedics, Biscup has won several awards, including the patient advocacy award from the American Academy of Pain Management; the Outstanding Educator Award from Cleveland Clinic's Orthopaedic Residency Training Program; two Medal of Merit Awards from the Ohio University's College of Osteopathic Medicine.

Biscup has traveled extensively in the United States and Europe teaching and demonstrating instrumentation, minimally invasive surgery and implants that he helped develop. Biscup has given over 100 lectures at professional meetings worldwide and in the U.S. Biscup continues to serve as the Senior Examiner for the American Osteopathic Board of Orthopedic Surgery. He has been Orthopedic consultant for the Cleveland Indians, Clinical Professor in Orthopedic Surgery at the Ohio University College of Osteopathic Medicine, and has served in several capacities at the Cleveland Clinic including Director of the Regional Spine Care Program and Chairman of the Cleveland Clinic Florida Spine Institute.

== Publications ==
Additionally, Biscup has published numerous medical articles.

Partial list:

- "Assessment of Internet Use and Effects Among Healthcare Professionals: A Cross Sectional Survey. Neurotrauma", (November 2006) Postgraduate Medical Journal. PMID 16597816
- "Complications Associated With Minimally Invasive Decompression For Lumbar Spinal Stenosis.” (August 2006) Journal of Spinal Disorders & Techniques. PMID 16770211
- “Evaluation of Cold Therapy in Postoperative Spine Patients.” (May 2005) Surgical Technology International. PMID 15858767
- “Chronic Non-malignant Musculoskeletal Pain in Older Adults: Clinical Issues and Opioid Intervention.” (February 2004) Postgraduate Medical Journal. PMID 14654573
- “Seven-year Follow-up of Vertebral Excision and Reconstruction for Malignant Hemangioendothelioma of Bone.” (May 1995) Spine. PMID 770140
- “Posterior Transvertebral Osteotomy for Adult Thoracolumbar Kyphosis.” (February 1995) Spine. PMID 7825046
- “Reduction of High-grade Slips (grades III-V) With VSP Instrumentation. Report of a Series of 41 Cases.” (August 1991) Spine. PMID 1862430
- “Segmental Spine Plates with Pedicle Screw Fixation. A New Internal Fixation Device for Disorders Of The Lumbar And Thoracolumbar Spine.” (April 1986) Clinical Orthopaedics and Related Research. PMID 3955996
