= Barbara Ross-Lee =

American physician, college dean (b. 1942)

Barbara Ross-Lee DO
- Born: June 1, 1942 (age 84); Detroit, Michigan, U.S.
- Education: Wayne State University; Michigan State University College of Osteopathic Medicine
- Occupations: Physician, Academic
- Employer(s): New York Institute of Technology College of Osteopathic Medicine; Minnesota College of Osteopathic Medicine
- Known for: First African American female dean of a US medical school
- Spouses: James Lee (m. 1964; div. 1970) Edmond Beverly (m. 1976)
- Children: 5
- Family: Diana Ross (sister); Rhonda Ross Kendrick (niece); Tracee Ellis Ross (niece); Evan Ross (nephew)

Barbara Ross-Lee, D.O. (born June 1, 1942) is an American physician, academic, and the first African-American woman to serve as dean of a U.S. medical school; she is also known as the sister of Diana Ross along with being the aunt of actress Tracee Ellis Ross, and singer-songwriters Rhonda Ross Kendrick and Evan Ross. She majored in biology and chemistry at Wayne State University, graduating in 1965. Then, in 1969, she entered Michigan State University's College of Osteopathic Medicine. Ross-Lee then went on to open her own private family practice, teach as a professor, and hold other positions within the medical community. In 1993, she was appointed dean of Ohio University's Heritage College of Osteopathic Medicine. She has earned several awards and honors for her work and accomplishments.

== Life and education ==
Ross-Lee was born to Ernestine (née Moten; January 27, 1916 – October 9, 1984) and Fred Ross, Sr. (July 4, 1920 – November 21, 2007) and raised in Detroit. She is the eldest of six children, including sister Diana Ross. Ross-Lee attended Wayne State University for her undergraduate education. She was married during her junior year, which prolonged graduation by a year. Barbara Ross had begun her pre-medical studies at Wayne State University in 1960, during the growth of the civil rights movement. At that time, few medical schools offered admission to minority students and neither federal nor private funding was available to help support students from low-income families. At Wayne State, her pre-medical advisor did not believe women should be physicians, and so she declined to authorize Ross's request to study human anatomy as her major. Ross instead graduated with a bachelor of science degree in biology and chemistry in 1965 and joined the National Teacher Corps, a federal program, in which she could earn a degree while teaching simultaneously in the Detroit public school system. After completing the program in 1969, a new educational opportunity arose when Michigan State University opened a school of osteopathic medicine in Pontiac, a Detroit suburb, to which Ross-Lee applied and was accepted. After opening her own private practice in family medicine, she later remarried to Edmond Beverly, who worked for the Michigan public schools. Together, they raised Ross-Lee's five children.

== Career ==
After graduating from medical school, Ross-Lee remained in Detroit working at her private practice for ten years. She then took a position with the United States Department of Health and Human Services where she worked on medical education and people of color in medicine. Dr. Ross-Lee was also community representative on the Governor's Minority Health Advisory Committee for the state of Michigan from 1990 to 1993. She was the first osteopathic physician to receive the prestigious Robert Wood Johnson Health Policy Fellowship. Dr. Ross-Lee was also awarded the "Magnificent 7" Award presented in 1993 by Business and Professional Women. She has received the Women's Health Award from Blackboard African-American National Bestsellers for her contributions to women's health, the Distinguished Public Service Award from the Oklahoma State University College of Osteopathic Medicine and an honorary doctorate of science from the New York Institute of Technology.

=== First African American woman dean of a U.S. Medical School ===
In 1993, Ross-Lee became the first African American woman dean of a United States medical school. She remained dean of the College of Osteopathic Medicine of Ohio University until 2001. During her tenure there, she reformulated the entire course of study, and drafted a women's curriculum, earning a reputation as a "change agent." Ross-Lee led the American Osteopathic Association's Health Policy Fellowship program and the Training in Policy Studies program.

=== New York Institute of Technology College of Osteopathic Medicine (NYIT-COM) ===
After leaving Heritage, she became the vice president of Health Sciences and Medical Affairs at the New York Institute of Technology; in 2002, she became dean of its New York Institute of Technology College of Osteopathic Medicine (NYIT-COM). She continued to hold her position as the vice president of Health Sciences and Affairs at the New York Institute of Technology College of Osteopathic Medicine during her deanship and advocated for women and people of color in the medical field, as well as for the greater field of osteopathic medicine. Ross-Lee was dean of the School of Health Professions and the College of Osteopathic Medicine. During her tenure at New York Institute of Technology, Ross-Lee built NYITCOM into the fourth largest medical school in the U.S., the fourth highest ranked osteopathic medicine program in the U.S., and helped establish NYITCOM at Arkansas State University in 2016. Ross-Lee was also an appointed member of the National Institutes of Health's Advisory Committee on Research on Women's Health and served on the National Advisory Committee on Rural Health of the U.S. Department of Health and Human Services. Dr. Ross-Lee is currently a fellow of the American Osteopathic Board of Family Physicians, a member of the American Osteopathic Association's Bureau of Professional Education, and the Trilateral International Medical Workforce Group of the United States Agency for International Development.

=== Minnesota College of Osteopathic Medicine ===
In 2018, Ross-Lee was appointed the founding dean and chief academic officer of the Minnesota College of Osteopathic Medicine, Minnesota's first osteopathic medical school, which was to be located in Gaylord, Minnesota. Projects for the college was later disbanded to offer resources for the establish of the Kansas Health Sciences Center, whose Kansas College of Osteopathic Medicine was granted candidate status by the Commission on Osteopathic College Accreditation as of 2021.

=== Maryland College of Osteopathic Medicine ===
In February 2022, the Morgan State University Board of Regents announced in a public session minutes that Dr. Ross-Lee had been hired as president of the proposed Maryland College of Osteopathic Medicine at Morgan State University. The university anticipates pre-accreditation by 2023 and its first class of entering students in the fall of 2024.

== Honors and awards ==
- Ohio Women's Hall of Fame (1998)
- Fellow, American Osteopathic Board of Family Physicians
- Member, Trilateral International Medical Workforce Group
- Member, NIH Advisory Committee on Research on Women's Health
- Member, DHHS Advisory Committee on Rural Health
- Distinguished Public Service Award, Oklahoma State University College of Osteopathic Medicine
- Honorary Doctorate of Science, New York Institute of Technology
- Distinguished Service Certificate, AOA, October 2013
- AOA's 40 Great Pioneers of Osteopathic Medicine, 2008
- The History Makers Foundation’s Medical History Makers Award, 2007
