= Growth hormone deficiency =

- Other names: Pituitary dwarfism
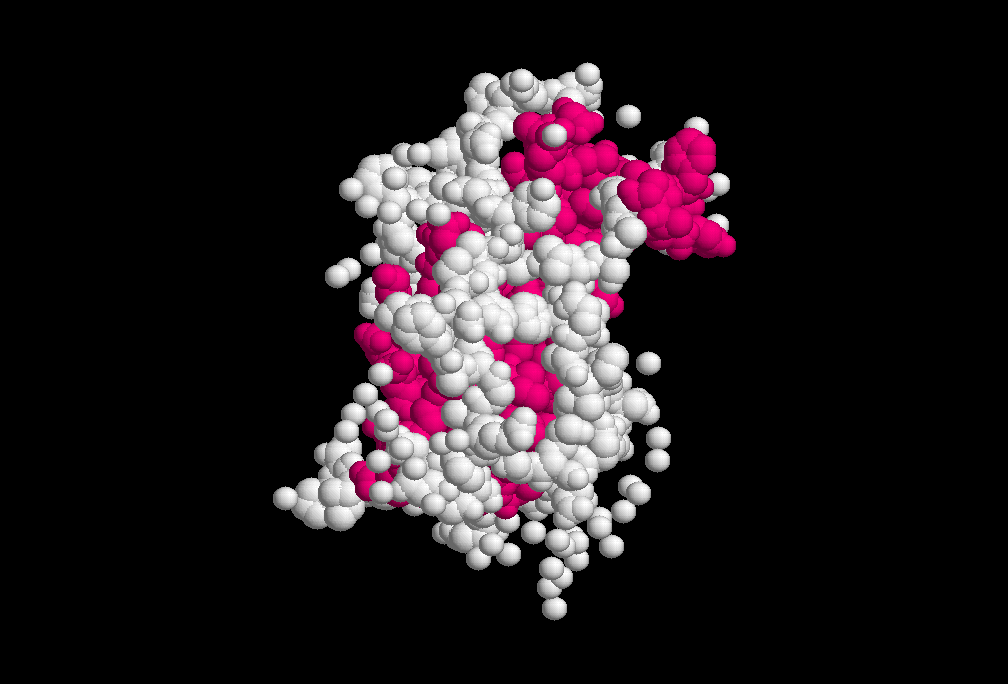
- Growth hormone
- Specialty: Endocrinology
- Symptoms: Short height
- Complications: Low blood sugar, high cholesterol levels, poor bone density
- Types: Congenital, acquired
- Causes: Not enough growth hormone
- Risk factors: Genetics, trauma, infections, tumors, radiation therapy
- Diagnostic method: Blood tests for growth hormone
- Differential diagnosis: Small for gestational age, Turner syndrome, Noonan syndrome, Prader-Willi syndrome
- Treatment: Growth hormone replacement growth hormone injections
- Frequency: Unclear

Growth hormone deficiency (GHD), or hyposomatotropism, is a medical condition resulting from not enough growth hormone (GH). Generally the most noticeable symptom is that an individual attains a short height. Newborns may also present low blood sugar or a small penis size. In adults there may be decreased muscle mass, high cholesterol levels, or poor bone density.

GHD can be present at birth or develop later in life. Causes may include genetics, trauma, infections, tumors, or radiation therapy. Genes that may be involved include GH1, GHRHR, or BTK. In a third of cases no cause is apparent. The underlying mechanism generally involves problems with the pituitary gland. Some cases are associated with a lack of other pituitary hormones, in which case it is known as combined pituitary hormone deficiency. Diagnosis involves blood tests to measure growth hormone levels.

Treatment is by growth hormone replacement using synthetic human growth hormone. The frequency of the condition is unclear. Most cases are initially noticed in children. The genetic forms of this disease are estimated to affect about 1 in 7,000 people. Most types occur equally in males and females though males are more often diagnosed.

== Signs and symptoms ==
=== Child ===
Severe prenatal deficiency of GH, as occurs in congenital hypopituitarism, has little effect on fetal growth. However, prenatal and congenital deficiency can reduce the size of a male's penis, especially when gonadotropins are also deficient. Besides micropenis in males, additional consequences of severe deficiency in the first days of life can include hypoglycemia and exaggerated jaundice (both direct and indirect hyperbilirubinemia).

Even congenital GH deficiency does not usually impair length growth until after the first few months of life. From late in the first year until mid-teens, poor growth and/or shortness is the hallmark of childhood GH deficiency. Growth is not as severely affected in GH deficiency as in untreated hypothyroidism, but growth at about half the usual velocity for age is typical. It tends to be accompanied by delayed physical maturation so that bone maturation and puberty may be several years delayed. When severe GH deficiency is present from birth and never treated, adult heights can be as short as 48–65 inches (120–170 cm).

Severe GH deficiency in early childhood also results in slower muscular development, so that gross motor milestones such as standing, walking, and jumping may be delayed. Body composition (i.e., the relative amounts of bone, muscle, and fat) is affected in many children with severe deficiency, so that mild to moderate chubbiness is common (though GH deficiency alone rarely causes severe obesity). Some severely GH-deficient children have recognizable, cherubic facial features characterized by maxillary hypoplasia and forehead prominence.

Other side effects in children include sparse hair growth and frontal recession, and pili torti and trichorrhexis nodosa are also sometimes present.

=== Adults ===
Recognised effects include:

- Increased 5-alpha-reductase
- Reduced sex hormone-binding globulin (SHBG)
- Reduced muscle mass and strength
- Baldness in men
- Reduced bone mass and osteoporosis (Decreased bone density)
- Reduced energy
- Impaired concentration and memory loss
- Increased body fat, particularly around the waistline
- Lipid abnormalities, particularly raised LDL cholesterol
- Increased levels of fibrinogen and plasminogen activator inhibitor
- Cardiac dysfunction, including a thickened intima media
- Lack of well-being
- Depression and anxiety
- Social isolation
- Fibromyalgia syndrome
- Neuromuscular dysfunction
- Central adiposity
- Decreased muscle mass
- Insulin resistance
- Accelerated atherogenesis
- Prothrombotic state
- Decreased sweating and thermoregulation.

== Causes ==
Growth hormone deficiency in childhood commonly has no identifiable cause (idiopathic), and adult-onset GHD is commonly due to pituitary tumours and their treatment or to cranial irradiation. A more complete list of causes includes:

- mutations of specific genes (e.g., GHRHR, GH1)
- congenital diseases such as Prader-Willi syndrome, Turner syndrome, or short-stature homeobox gene deficiency
- congenital malformations involving the pituitary (e.g., septo-optic dysplasia, posterior pituitary ectopia)
- chronic kidney disease
- intracranial tumors in or near the sella turcica, especially craniopharyngioma
- damage to the pituitary from radiation therapy to the head (e.g. for leukemia or brain tumors), from surgery, from trauma, or from intracranial disease (e.g. hydrocephalus)
- autoimmune inflammation (hypophysitis)
- ischemic or hemorrhagic infarction from low blood pressure (Sheehan syndrome) or hemorrhage pituitary apoplexy

There are a variety of rare diseases that resemble GH deficiency, including the childhood growth failure, facial appearance, delayed bone age, and low insulin-like growth factor-1 (IGF-1) levels. However, GH testing elicits normal or high levels of GH in the blood, demonstrating that the problem is not due to a deficiency of GH but rather to a reduced sensitivity to its action. Insensitivity to GH is traditionally termed Laron dwarfism, but over the last 15 years many different types of GH resistance have been identified, primarily involving mutations of the GH binding protein or receptors.

Familial isolated growth hormone deficiency (IGHD) can be inherited as an autosomal recessive (type I), autosomal dominant (type II), or X-linked (type III) characteristic.

== Pathophysiology ==
As an adult ages, it is normal for the pituitary to produce diminishing amounts of GH and many other hormones, particularly the sex steroids. Physicians, therefore, distinguish between the natural reduction in GH levels which comes with age, and the much lower levels of "true" deficiency. Such deficiency almost always has an identifiable cause, with adult-onset GHD without a definable cause ("idiopathic GH deficiency") extremely rare. GH does function in adulthood to maintain muscle and bone mass and strength, and has poorly understood effects on cognition and mood.

== Diagnosis ==
Although GH can be readily measured in a blood sample, testing for GH deficiency is constrained by the fact that levels are nearly undetectable for most of the day. This makes simple measurement of GH in a single blood sample useless for detecting deficiency. Physicians, therefore use a combination of indirect and direct criteria in assessing GHD, including:

- Auxologic criteria (defined by body measurements)
- Indirect hormonal criteria (IGF levels from a single blood sample)
- Direct hormonal criteria (measurement of GH in multiple blood samples to determine secretory patterns or responses to provocative testing), in particular:
  - Subnormal frequency and amplitude of GH secretory peaks when sampled over several hours
  - Subnormal GH secretion in response to at least two provocative stimuli
  - Increased IGF1 levels after a few days of GH treatment
- Response to GH treatment
- Corroborative evidence of pituitary dysfunction

"Provocative tests" involve giving a dose of an agent that will normally provoke a pituitary to release a burst of growth hormone. An intravenous line is established, the agent is given, and small amounts of blood are drawn at 15-minute intervals over the next hour to determine if a rise of GH was provoked. Agents which have been used clinically to stimulate and assess GH secretion are arginine, levodopa, clonidine, epinephrine and propranolol, glucagon, and insulin. An insulin tolerance test has been shown to be reproducible, age-independent, and able to distinguish between GHD and normal adults, and so is the test of choice.

Severe GH deficiency in childhood additionally has the following measurable characteristics:

- Proportional stature well below that expected for family heights, although this characteristic may not be present in the case of familial-linked GH deficiency
- Below-normal velocity of growth
- Delayed physical maturation
- Delayed bone age
- Low levels of IGF1, IGF2, IGF binding protein 3
- Increased growth velocity after a few months of GH treatment

In childhood and adulthood, the diagnosing doctor will look for these features accompanied by corroboratory evidence of hypopituitarism such as deficiency of other pituitary hormones, a structurally abnormal pituitary, or a history of damage to the pituitary. This would confirm the diagnosis; in the absence of pituitary pathology, further testing would be required.

=== Classification ===
Growth hormone deficiency can be congenital or acquired in childhood or adult life. It can be partial or complete. It is usually permanent, but sometimes transient. It may be an isolated deficiency or occur in association with deficiencies of other pituitary hormones.

The term hypopituitarism is often used interchangeably with GH deficiency but more often denotes GH deficiency plus deficiency of at least one other anterior pituitary hormone. When GH deficiency (usually with other anterior pituitary deficiencies) is associated with posterior pituitary hormone deficiency (usually diabetes insipidus), the condition is termed panhypopituitarism.

== Treatment ==
GH deficiency is treated by replacing GH with daily injections under the skin or into muscle. Until 1985, growth hormone for treatment was obtained by extraction from human pituitary glands collected at autopsy. Since 1985, recombinant human growth hormone (rHGH) is a recombinant form of human GH produced by genetically engineered bacteria, manufactured by recombinant DNA technology. In both children and adults, costs of treatment in terms of money, effort, and the impact on day-to-day life, are substantial.

=== Child ===
GH treatment is not recommended for children who are not growing despite having normal levels of growth hormone, and in the UK it is not licensed for this use. Children requiring treatment usually receive daily injections of growth hormone. Most pediatric endocrinologists monitor growth and adjust dose every 3–6 months and many of these visits involve blood tests and x-rays. Treatment is usually extended as long as the child is growing, and lifelong continuation may be recommended for those most severely deficient. Nearly painless insulin syringes, pen injectors, or a needle-free delivery system reduce the discomfort. Injection sites include the biceps, thigh, buttocks, and stomach. Injection sites should be rotated daily to avoid lipoatrophy. Treatment is expensive, costing as much as US$10,000 to $40,000 a year in the US.

=== Adults ===
GH supplementation is not recommended medically for the physiologic age-related decline in GH/IGF secretion. It may be appropriate in diagnosed adult-onset deficiency, where a weekly dose of approximately 25% of that given to children is given. Lower doses again are called for in the elderly to reduce the incidence of side effects and maintain age-dependent normal levels of IGF-1.

In many countries, including the UK, the majority view among endocrinologists is that the failure of treatment to provide any demonstrable, measurable benefits in terms of outcomes means treatment is not recommended for all adults with severe GHD, and national guidelines in the UK as set out by NICE suggest three criteria which all need to be met for treatment to be indicated:

1. Severe GH deficiency, defined as a peak GH response of <9mU/litre during an insulin tolerance test
2. Perceived impairment of quality of life, as assessed by questionnaire
3. They are already treated for other pituitary hormone disorders

Where treatment is indicated, duration is dependent upon indication.

Cost of adult treatment in the UK is 3000-4000 GBP annually.

=== Side effects ===
- Headaches
- Joint pain and muscle pain
- Fluid retention, and carpal tunnel syndrome
- Mild hypertension
- Visual problems
- Nausea and vomiting
- Paraesthesiae
- Antibody formation
- Reactions at the injection site
- Rarely, benign intracranial hypertension.

== Prognosis ==
=== Child ===
When treated with GH, a severely deficient child will begin to grow faster within months. In the first year of treatment, the rate of growth may increase from half as fast as other children are growing to twice as fast (e.g., from 1 inch a year to 4 inches, or 2.5 cm to 10). Growth typically slows in subsequent years, but usually remains above normal so that over several years a child who had fallen far behind in their height may grow into the normal height range. Excess adipose tissue may be reduced.

=== Adults ===
GH treatment can confer a number of measurable benefits to severely GH-deficient adults, such as enhanced energy and strength, and improved bone density. Muscle mass may increase at the expense of adipose tissue. Although adults with hypopituitarism have been shown to have a reduced life expectancy, and a cardiovascular mortality rate of more than double controls, treatment has not been shown to improve mortality, although blood lipid levels do improve. Similarly, although measurements of bone density improve with treatment, rates of fractures have not been shown to improve.

Effects on quality of life are unproven, with a number of studies finding that adults with GHD had near-normal indicators of QoL at baseline (giving little scope for improvement), and many using outdated dosing strategies. However, it may be that those adults with poor QoL at the start of treatment do benefit.

== Epidemiology ==
The incidence of idiopathic GHD in infants is about 1 in every 3800 live births, and rates in older children are rising as more children survive childhood cancers which are treated with radiotherapy, although exact rates are hard to obtain. The incidence of genuine adult-onset GHD, normally due to pituitary tumours, is estimated at 10 per million.

== History ==
Like many other 19th century medical terms which lost precise meaning as they gained wider currency, "midget" as a term for someone with severe proportional shortness acquired pejorative connotations and is no longer used in a medical context.

Notable modern pop cultural figures with growth hormone deficiency include actor and comedian Andy Milonakis, who has the appearance and voice of an adolescent boy despite being in his 50s. Argentine footballer Lionel Messi was diagnosed at age 10 with growth hormone deficiency and was subsequently treated. TLC reality star Shauna Rae was affected by a medically-caused growth hormone deficiency resulting from childhood glioblastoma cancer treatment. Oscar winning actress Linda Hunt was diagnosed as having this condition when a teenager.

== See also ==
- Hypothalamic–pituitary–somatic axis
