= Pegvisomant =

Pharmaceutical drug

Clinical data
- Trade names: Somavert
- AHFS/Drugs.com: Monograph
- License data: EU EMA: by INN; US DailyMed: Pegvisomant
- Pregnancy category: AU: B3
- Routes of administration: Subcutaneous
- ATC code: H01AX01 (WHO)

Legal status
- Legal status: AU: S4 (Prescription only); US: ℞-only; EU: Rx-only

Identifiers
- CAS Number: 218620-50-9
- IUPHAR/BPS: 7485
- DrugBank: DB00082
- ChemSpider: none
- UNII: N824AOU5XV
- KEGG: D05394
- ChEMBL: ChEMBL1201515

Chemical and physical data
- Formula: C_{990}H_{1532}N_{262}O_{300}S_{7}
- Molar mass: 22129.10 g·mol^{−1}

Pegvisomant, sold under the brand name Somavert, is a growth hormone receptor antagonist used in the treatment of acromegaly. It is primarily used if the pituitary gland tumor causing the acromegaly cannot be controlled with surgery or radiation, and the use of somatostatin analogues is unsuccessful, but is also effective as a monotherapy. It is delivered as a powder that is mixed with water and injected under the skin.

== Medical uses ==
Pegvisomant is indicated for the treatment of adults with acromegaly.

== Side effects ==
Side effects of pegvisomant include reactions at the injection site, swelling of the limbs, chest pain, hypoglycemia, nausea and hepatitis.

== Discovery ==
Pegvisomant was discovered at Ohio University in 1987 by Distinguished Professor John Kopchick and graduate student Wen Chen at the Edison Biotechnology Institute. After completing clinical trials, it was approved for the treatment of acromegaly by the FDA in 2003 and marketed by Pfizer.

== Structure ==
Pegvisomant is a protein containing 191 amino acid residues to which several polyethylene glycol polymers have been covalently bound in order to slow clearance from the blood. The protein is a modified version of human growth hormone designed to bind to and block the growth hormone receptor. It is manufactured using genetically modified E. coli bacteria.

== Mechanism of action ==
Pegvisomant blocks the action of growth hormone on the growth hormone receptor to reduce the production of IGF-1. IGF-1 is responsible for most of the symptoms of acromegaly, and the normalization of its levels can control the symptoms.

Long-term treatment studies with pegvisomant as a monotherapy have shown it to be safe, and effective.

== Research ==
Some studies show the potential of using pegvisomant as an anti-tumor treatment for certain types of cancers.
