= Expert Review of Anticancer Therapy =

- Discipline: Oncology
- Language: English
- Edited by: Gertjan JL Kaspers

Publication details
- History: 2001-present
- Publisher: Informa
- Frequency: Monthly

Standard abbreviations
- ISO 4: Expert Rev. Anticancer Ther.

Indexing
- CODEN: ERATBJ
- ISSN: 1473-7140 (print); 1744-8328 (web)
- OCLC no.: 60638399

Links
- Journal homepage; Online access; Online archive

Expert Review of Anticancer Therapy is a monthly peer-reviewed medical journal covering all clinical aspects of cancer therapy. It was established in 2001 and is published by Taylor & Francis under the academic publishing division of Informa. The current Editor-in-Chief is Gertjan J L Kaspers who is Head of Pediatric Oncology at VU University Medical Center Amsterdam.
