= Mecasermin =

Pharmaceutical drug

Clinical data
- Trade names: Increlex
- Other names: FK-780; Recombinant human insulin-like growth factor-1; rhIGF-1; Somatomedin-1
- AHFS/Drugs.com: Monograph
- Pregnancy category: AU: B3
- Routes of administration: Subcutaneous injection
- ATC code: H01AC03 (WHO)

Legal status
- Legal status: AU: S4 (Prescription only); CA: ℞-only / Schedule D; US: ℞-only

Pharmacokinetic data
- Elimination half-life: 5.8 hours

Identifiers
- CAS Number: 68562-41-4
- DrugBank: DB01277
- ChemSpider: none
- UNII: 7GR9I2683O
- KEGG: D04870
- ChEMBL: ChEMBL1201716

Chemical and physical data
- Formula: C_{331}H_{512}N_{94}O_{101}S_{7}
- Molar mass: 7648.71 g·mol^{−1}

Mecasermin, sold under the brand name Increlex, also known as recombinant human insulin-like growth factor-1 (rhIGF-1), is a recombinant form of human insulin-like growth factor 1 (IGF-I) which is used in the long-term treatment of growth failure and short stature in children with severe primary IGF-I deficiency, for instance due to growth hormone deficiency or Laron syndrome (growth hormone insensitivity).

Mecasermin has a biological half-life of about 5.8 hours in children with severe primary IGF-1 deficiency.

A related medication is mecasermin rinfabate (brand name Iplex), which is a combination of mecasermin (rhIGF-1), insulin-like growth factor binding protein-3 (IGFBP-3), and insulin-like growth factor binding protein acid labile subunit (IGFALS) as a ternary complex. The complex serves to prolong the action of mecasermin in the human body; the half-life of mecasermin when provided as this complex is 13.4 hours in individuals with severe primary IGF-1 deficiency.

Mecasermin therapy has been also shown to be beneficial in other conditions not related to growth failure, including diabetes mellitus and anorexia nervosa.
