= Zvi Laron =

Israeli pediatric endocrinologist

Zvi Laron MD, PhD (hc)
- צבי לרון
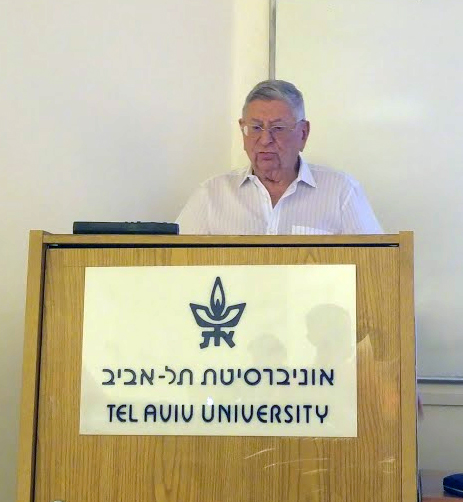
- Laron in 2017
- Born: February 6, 1927 (age 99); Cernăuți, Romania (now Ukraine)
- Citizenship: Israeli
- Education: Hebrew University Medical School
- Occupation: pediatric endocrinologist
- Known for: Laron syndrome
- Website: ORCID no. 0000-0002-4058-5758 Peer reviewed publications 949 (ResearchGate (July 26, 2026)) H-index 80 Citations 27571 i10-index 455 (Google Scholar (July 26, 2026))

Zvi Laron (Hebrew: צבי לרון; born February 6, 1927) is an Israeli paediatric endocrinologist. Laron is a professor emeritus at the Gray Faculty of Medical and Health Sciences, Tel Aviv University. In 1966, he described the type of dwarfism later called Laron syndrome. His research contributed to the understanding of the action of Growth hormone / IGF-I axis and enabled the treatment of many children with IGF-I deficiency. He was also the first to introduce the multidisciplinary treatment for juvenile diabetes and other chronic childhood disorders. At present he serves as Director of the Endocrinology and Diabetes Research Unit at Schneider Children's Medical Center in Israel.

== Biography ==
=== Early life ===
Laron was born on February 6, 1927, to a Jewish family in the Bukovinian city of Cernăuţi (Chernivtsi), then in Romania (now in Ukraine). At the age of 6, he moved with his family to another Bukovinian town, Rădăuți. Following the June 1941 invasion of the USSR by Nazi Germany, Romania allied itself with Nazi Germany and regained Northern Bukovina (which had been annexed by the USSR in 1940), the 14-year-old child and his family were deported to the concentration camps of Transnistria. There he had the chance to survive as a worker in a factory, which was founded in Mogilev by his uncle, Siegfried Sami Jagendorf (1885–1970), and saved many Jewish deportees. There, Laron became a licensed iron turner.

=== Education and Career ===
After the end of the war, Laron was able to complete his high school studies at Eudoxiu Hurmuzachi National College and in 1945 he commenced his studies in medicine at the newly founded Medical School (Institutul medico-farmaceutic) in the town of Timișoara, in western Romania. He was an active member of the Zionist students movement "Hasmonea", and left Romania in 1947 in order to emigrate illegally to Eretz Israel, then Mandatory Palestine. After his arrival, he joined the army and served in the "Dajani" and Tel Hashomer's hospitals. In 1952, he graduated with MD from the Hadassah Hospital Hebrew University Medical School, Jerusalem. He then did his internship at Rambam Hospital in Haifa. During 1954–1957, he was a research and clinical fellow in paediatrics at the Massachusetts General Hospital and Harvard Medical School Boston, and at the Children's Hospital in Pittsburgh, where his fellowship was in childhood endocrinology, including diabetes. He is married to his long-term wife Tova.

=== Work as endocrinologist in Israel ===
At the end of 1957, Laron returned to Israel and in January 1958 he was involved in founding the Rogoff Research Institute at the Beilinson Medical Center in Petah Tikva. He describes Dr. André de Vries as "a major influence and mentor." He established the Institute for Pediatric and Adolescent Endocrinology and led it in Beilinson until 1992, after which the institute moved to the newly opened Schneider Children's Medical Center of Israel. Laron was one of the first teachers at the School of Medicine at Tel Aviv University and had a helped establish their pediatric teaching program. From 1983 to 1997 Laron was Incumbent of the Irene and Nicholas Marsh Chair in Endocrinology and Juvenile Diabetes, Sackler Faculty of Medicine, Tel Aviv University. He also founded the All-Country Center for Juvenile Diabetes and an endocrinological laboratory aimed to develop new radioimmunoassay methods for hormones in blood in the frame of the Felsenstein Institute of Research.

In 1966, together with A. Pertzelan and S. Mannheimer, he described a new type of dwarfism (subsequently named "Laron Syndrome" or “growth hormone insensitivity”) characterized by high levels of GH in serum, and low to undetectable IGF-I sconcentrations. The Institute of Pediatric Endocrinology was among the first medical centers in the world to produce human grade GH and use in therapy both hGH and IGF-1 (insulin-like growth factor 1) hormones.

Laron is Professor Emeritus of the Pediatric Endocrinology, Tel Aviv University and Director of Endocrinology and Diabetes Research Unit, Schneider Children's Medical Center of Israel.

Laron was among the founders of the European Society of Pediatric Endocrinology (ESPE) and International Society for Pediatric and Adolescent Diabetes (ISPAD) and served as their Secretary and President. He was also a founder of the Growth Hormone Research Society (GRS). He initiated new pediatric Endocrinology journals: Journal of Pediatric Endocrinology and Metabolism (PEM), Pediatric and Adolescent Endocrinology series and Pediatric Endocrinology Reviews (PER), and served as their editor.

== Awards ==
Zvi Laron has received numerous honors and awards:

- 1982 Paul Langerhans Medal, German Diabetes Association
- 1987 Elected Member, the German National Academy of Sciences Leopoldina
- 1993 Award of Merit by ISPAD (In Soc Ped & Adolesc Diabetology)
- 1995 Honorary Member of the Medical and Scientific Academy of Romania
- 1998 Doctor Honoris Causa University of Medicine and Pharmacy "Iuliu Hatieganu", Cluj-Napoca, Romania
- 1998 Centennial Medal, Italian Pediatric Society
- 1999 Andrea Prader Prize – ESPE (Europ Soc Pediatr Endocrinol)
- 2000 Doctor Honoris Causa, University of Medicine and Pharmacy, Timișoara, Romania
- 2000 Doctor Honoris Causa, University of Novara, Italy
- 2001 The Endocrine Society (USA) Clinical Investigator Award
- 2003 Prize for achievements in Science, Education and Advocacy for Childhood Diabetes – International Society for Pediatric and Adolescent Diabetes (ISPAD)
- 2008 Knight First Class of the Order of the White Rose of Finland awarded by the President of the State of Finland
- 2009 Israel Prize awarded by the State of Israel in recognition for contributions in the field of pediatric endocrinology and diabetes
- 2016 Growth Hormone Research Society Honorary Member
- 2025 Highly Ranked Scholar – Lifetime, ScholarGPS

== Selected articles on important discoveries ==
1. Laron Z, Pertzelan A, Mannheimer S. Genetic pituitary dwarfism with high serum concentration of growth hormone—a new inborn error of metabolism? Isr j med sci. 1966;2:152-5
2. Laron Z, Pertzelan A, Karp M, Kowadlo-Silbergeld A, Daughaday WH. Administration of growth hormone to patients with familial dwarfism with high plasma immunoreactivity growth hormone: measurement of sulfation factor, metabolic and linear growth responses. J cli endocrinol metab (JCEM). 1971;33:332-42
3. Laron Z, Galatzer A, Amir S, Gil R, Karp M, Mimouni M. A multidisciplinary, comprehensive, ambulatory treatment scheme for diabetes mellitus in children. Diabetes care. 1979;2:342-8
4. Eshet R, Laron Z, Pertzelan A, Arnon R, Dintzman M. Defect of human growth hormone receptors in the liver of two patients with Laron-type dwarfism. Isr j med sci. 1984;20:8-11
5. Godowski PJ, Leung DW, Meacham LR, Galgani JP, Hellmiss R, Keret R, et al. Characterization of the human growth hormone receptor gene and demonstration of a partial gene deletion in two patients with Laron-type dwarfism. Proceedings of the National Academy of Sciences of the United States of America. 1989;86:8083-7
6. Gil-Ad I, Leibowitch N, Josefsberg Z, Wasserman M, Laron Z. Effect of oral clonidine, insulin-induced hypoglycemia and exercise on plasma GHRH levels in short-stature children. Acta endocrinologica. 1990;122:89-95
7. Laron Z. Laron syndrome (primary growth hormone resistance or insensitivity): the personal experience 1958–2003. J cli endocrinol metab (JCEM). 2004;89:1031-44
8. Weinstein D, Simon M, Yehezkel E, Laron Z, Werner H. Insulin analogues display IGF-I-like mitogenic and anti-apoptotic activities in cultured cancer cells. Diab/metab res rev. 2009;25:41-9
9. Steuerman R, Shevah O, Laron Z. Congenital IGF1 deficiency tends to confer protection against post-natal development of malignancies. Europ j endocrinol. 2011;164:485-9
10. Laron Z, Werner H. Opposing Metabolic Effects of Growth Hormone and IGF-I: Review and Clinical Implications. Endocr Rev. 2025:bnaf022.
11. Rabin T, Shinar Y, Laron Z. LARON SYNDROME. (Growth Hormone Insensitivity) Geographical distribution and relationship to the genetic defects in the growth hormone receptor gene. J Clin Endocrinol Metab. 2026 Jul 15:dgag253.

== Books authored ==
- Thomas J. Mérimée, Zvi Laron. Growth Hormone, IGF-I and Growth: New Views of Old Concepts. Freund Publishing House, London, UK, 1996
- Zvi Laron, John Kopchick. Laron Syndrome – From Man to Mouse. Lessons from Clinical and Experimental Experience. Springer, Heidelberg, 2011

== Books edited ==
- Zvi Laron. Habilitation and Rehabilitation of Juvenile Diabetics: Proceedings. Williams and Wilkins company, 1970
- Zvi Laron. The Adipose Child. S. Kager Pub, Basel, 1976
- Zvi Laron, Avinoam Galatzer. Psychological Aspects of Diabetes in children and Adolescents. S.Karger Pub, Basel, 1983
- Laron Z, Rogol AD. Hormones and Sport. Raven Press, New York, 1989
- Zvi Laron, Otfrid Butenandt. Growth Hormone Replacement therapy in Adults: Pros and Cons. 1st Edition. Feund Publishing House Ltd, London, UK, 1993
- Laron Z, Parks JS. Lessons from Laron Syndrome (Ls) 1966–1992. A Model of GH and iGF-1 Action and Interaction. Pediatric and Adolescent Endocrinology, Volume 24. S. Karger Pub, Basel, 1993
- Zvi Laron, S. Mastragostino, C. Romano. Limb Lengthening for Whom, When & How? Freund Publi House Ltd, Londo, UK, 1995

== See also ==
- List of Israel Prize recipients
