= Growth hormone receptor =

Protein involved in the binding of the growth hormone

GHR
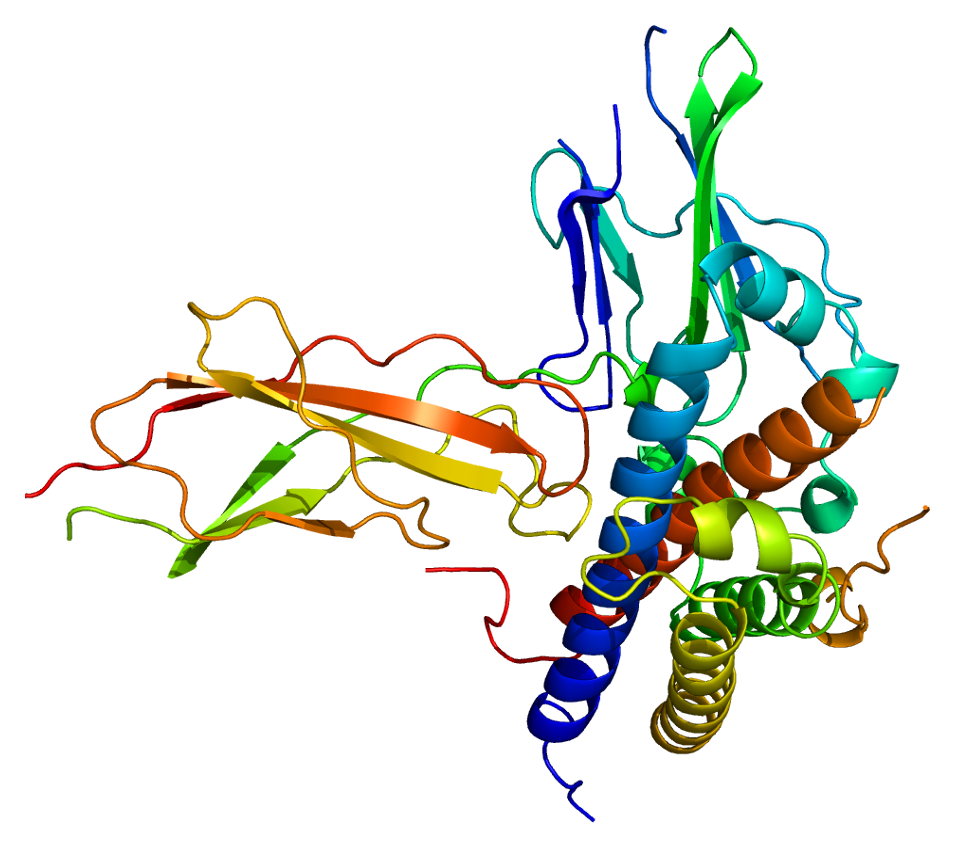

Identifiers
- Aliases: GHR, GHBP, GHIP, growth hormone receptor
- External IDs: OMIM: 600946; MGI: 95708; GeneCards: GHR
Available structures
| PDB | Ortholog search: PDBe RCSB |
| PDB | List of PDB id codes 1A22, 1AXI, 1HWG, 1HWH, 1KF9, 2AEW, 3HHR |

Gene location (Human)
| Chr. | Chromosome 5 (human) |
| Band | 5p13.1-p12 | Start | 42,423,439 bp |
| Band | 5p13.1-p12 | End | 42,721,878 bp |

Gene location (Mouse)
| Chr. | Chromosome 15 (mouse) |
| Band | 15 A1|15 1.84 cM | Start | 3,347,242 bp |
| Band | 15 A1|15 1.84 cM | End | 3,612,974 bp |
RNA expression pattern
| Bgee | Human / Mouse (ortholog); Top expressed in: Skeletal muscle tissue of rectus abdominis; Skeletal muscle tissue of biceps brachii; deltoid muscle; vastus lateralis muscle; liver; Achilles tendon; tibialis anterior muscle; glutes; triceps brachii muscle; adipose tissue / Top expressed in: proximal tubule; white adipose tissue; right kidney; left lobe of liver; human kidney; intercostal muscle; tunica adventitia of aorta; subcutaneous adipose tissue; ankle; sternocleidomastoid muscle; More reference expression data |
| BioGPS | More reference expression data |
Gene ontology
| Molecular function | protein homodimerization activity; growth factor binding; peptide hormone binding; protein binding; cytokine receptor activity; proline-rich region binding; protein kinase binding; identical protein binding; growth hormone receptor activity; cytokine binding |
| Cellular component | integral component of membrane; membrane; receptor complex; integral component of plasma membrane; extracellular region; cell surface; growth hormone receptor complex; extracellular space; cytosol; plasma membrane; cytoplasmic ribonucleoprotein granule; external side of plasma membrane |
| Biological process | insulin-like growth factor receptor signaling pathway; receptor signaling pathway via JAK-STAT; growth hormone receptor signaling pathway via JAK-STAT; response to estradiol; endocytosis; allantoin metabolic process; regulation of multicellular organism growth; cytokine-mediated signaling pathway; citrate metabolic process; receptor internalization; response to cycloheximide; 2-oxoglutarate metabolic process; creatinine metabolic process; oxaloacetate metabolic process; fatty acid metabolic process; succinate metabolic process; cellular response to hormone stimulus; growth hormone receptor signaling pathway; taurine metabolic process; valine metabolic process; positive regulation of multicellular organism growth; positive regulation of peptidyl-tyrosine phosphorylation; creatine metabolic process; isoleucine metabolic process; positive regulation of tyrosine phosphorylation of STAT protein; activation of Janus kinase activity; hormone metabolic process; positive regulation of receptor signaling pathway via JAK-STAT |
Sources:Amigo / QuickGO
Orthologs
| Databases | NCBI: entry; OMA: entry |
| Species | Human | Mouse |
| Entrez | 2690 | 14600 |
| Ensembl | ENSG00000112964 | ENSMUSG00000055737 |
| UniProt | P10912 | P16882 |
| RefSeq (mRNA) | NM_000163; NM_001242399; NM_001242400; NM_001242401; NM_001242402 NM_001242403; NM_001242404; NM_001242405; NM_001242406; NM_001242460; NM_001242461; NM_001242462 | NM_001048147; NM_001048178; NM_010284; NM_001286370 |
| RefSeq (protein) | NP_000154; NP_001229328; NP_001229329; NP_001229330; NP_001229331 NP_001229332; NP_001229333; NP_001229334; NP_001229335; NP_001229389; NP_001229391 | NP_001041643; NP_001273299; NP_034414 |
| Location (UCSC) | Chr 5: 42.42 – 42.72 Mb | Chr 15: 3.35 – 3.61 Mb |
| PubMed search |
- Wikidata
| View/Edit Human | View/Edit Mouse |

Growth hormone receptor is a protein that in humans is encoded by the GHR gene. GHR orthologs have been identified in most mammals.

== Structure ==
Growth hormone receptor (GHR) is a transmembrane protein consisting of 620 amino acids. The receptor is part of the Type I cytokine receptor family of receptors. GHR exists in two forms as a full length membrane-bound receptor and as a soluble GH binding protein (GHBP). GHR contains two fibronectin type III β domains in its extracellular domain, whereas the intracellular domain contains tyrosine Kinase JAK2 binding sites for SH2 proteins. JAK2 is the primary signal transducer for growth hormone.

== Function ==
This gene encodes a protein that is a transmembrane receptor for growth hormone. Binding of growth hormone to the receptor leads to reorientation of a pre-assembled receptor dimer dimerization (the receptor may however also exist as monomers on the cell surface) and the activation of an intra- and intercellular signal transduction pathway leading to growth. A common alternate allele of this gene, called GHRd3, lacks exon three and has been well characterized. Mutations in this gene have been associated with Laron syndrome, also known as the growth hormone insensitivity syndrome (GHIS), a disorder characterized by short stature (proportional dwarfism). Other splice variants, including one encoding a soluble form of the protein (GHRtr), have been observed but have not been thoroughly characterized. Laron mice (that is mice genetically engineered to carry defective Ghr), have a dramatic reduction in body mass (only reaching 50% of the weight of normal siblings), and also show a ~40% increase in lifespan.

Conserved and variable positions of the GHR protein are evidenced by multiple amino acid sequence comparisons among rodents. The site in yellow emphasizes a Proline shared by all species in blue and represents a protein signature of their common ancestry.

== Interactions ==
Growth hormone receptor has been shown to interact with SGTA, PTPN11, Janus kinase 2, Suppressor of cytokine signaling 1 and CISH.

== Evolution ==
The GHR gene is used in animals as a nuclear DNA phylogenetic marker. The exon 10 has first been experienced to explore the phylogeny of the major groups of Rodentia. GHR has also proven useful at lower taxonomic levels, e.g., in octodontoid, arvicoline, muroid, murine, and peromyscine rodents, in arctoid and felid carnivores, and in dermopterans. Note that the GHR intron 9 has also been used to investigate the mustelid and hyaenid carnivores phylogenetics.

== Antagonists ==
Growth hormone receptor antagonists such as pegvisomant (trade name Somavert) are used in the treatment of acromegaly. They are used if the tumor of the pituitary gland causing the acromegaly cannot be controlled with surgery or radiation, and the use of somatostatin analogues is unsuccessful. Pegvisomant is delivered as a powder that is mixed with sterilized water and injected under the skin.

== See also ==
- Hypothalamic–pituitary–somatic axis
