= Insulin-like growth factor 1 =

Protein found in humans

IGF1
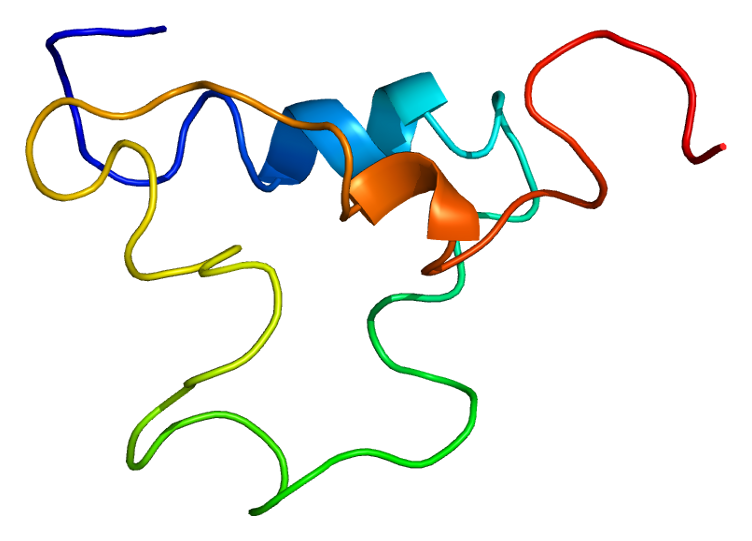

Identifiers
- Aliases: IGF1, IGF-I, IGF1A, IGFI, MGF, insulin like growth factor 1, IGF
- External IDs: OMIM: 147440; MGI: 96432; GeneCards: IGF1
Available structures
PDB	Ortholog search: PDBe RCSB
PDB	List of PDB id codes 1B9G, 1GZR, 1GZY, 1GZZ, 1H02, 1H59, 1IMX, 1PMX, 1TGR, 1WQJ, 2DSR, 2GF1, 3GF1, 3LRI, 1BQT, 4XSS

Gene location (Human)
Chr.	Chromosome 12 (human)
Band	12q23.2	Start	102,395,874 bp
Band	12q23.2	End	102,481,744 bp

Gene location (Mouse)
Chr.	Chromosome 10 (mouse)
Band	10 C1|10 43.7 cM	Start	87,694,127 bp
Band	10 C1|10 43.7 cM	End	87,772,904 bp
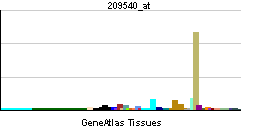

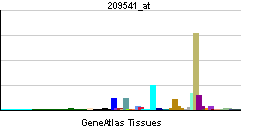

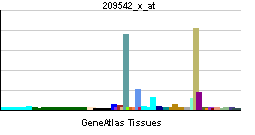
RNA expression pattern
Bgee	Human / Mouse (ortholog); Top expressed in: pericardium; tail of epididymis; tendon of biceps brachii; gastric mucosa; superficial temporal artery; seminal vesicula; urethra; caput epididymis; corpus epididymis; endometrium / Top expressed in: stria vascularis; internal carotid artery; efferent ductule; external carotid artery; iris; left lobe of liver; gallbladder; stroma of bone marrow; genital tubercle; white adipose tissue; More reference expression data
BioGPS	More reference expression data
Gene ontology
Molecular function	hormone activity; insulin receptor binding; growth factor activity; integrin binding; protein binding; insulin-like growth factor receptor binding
Cellular component	extracellular region; exocytic vesicle; insulin-like growth factor binding protein complex; platelet alpha granule lumen; insulin-like growth factor ternary complex; alphav-beta3 integrin-IGF-1-IGF1R complex; plasma membrane; extracellular space
Biological process	positive regulation of transcription regulatory region DNA binding; skeletal system development; positive regulation of glucose import; muscle organ development; positive regulation of Ras protein signal transduction; response to heat; positive regulation of cardiac muscle hypertrophy; positive regulation of smooth muscle cell migration; DNA replication; positive regulation of insulin-like growth factor receptor signaling pathway; phosphatidylinositol 3-kinase signaling; positive regulation of DNA binding; Ras protein signal transduction; cell population proliferation; positive regulation of mitotic nuclear division; positive regulation of trophectodermal cell proliferation; positive regulation of glycogen biosynthetic process; positive regulation of fibroblast proliferation; ERK1 and ERK2 cascade; negative regulation of extrinsic apoptotic signaling pathway; cell activation; negative regulation of oocyte development; positive regulation of transcription, DNA-templated; bone mineralization involved in bone maturation; positive regulation of peptidyl-tyrosine phosphorylation; positive regulation of MAPK cascade; proteoglycan biosynthetic process; positive regulation of activated T cell proliferation; positive regulation of epithelial cell proliferation; negative regulation of release of cytochrome c from mitochondria; protein stabilization; myotube cell development; positive regulation of DNA replication; myoblast proliferation; skeletal muscle satellite cell maintenance involved in skeletal muscle regeneration; positive regulation of protein secretion; positive regulation of glycoprotein biosynthetic process; regulation of gene expression; phosphatidylinositol-mediated signaling; positive regulation of smooth muscle cell proliferation; muscle hypertrophy; protein kinase B signaling; regulation of multicellular organism growth; positive regulation of cell migration; platelet degranulation; positive regulation of calcineurin-NFAT signaling cascade; positive regulation of phosphatidylinositol 3-kinase signaling; myoblast differentiation; glycolate metabolic process; positive regulation of glycolytic process; negative regulation of smooth muscle cell apoptotic process; signal transduction; positive regulation of transcription by RNA polymerase II; positive regulation of cell growth involved in cardiac muscle cell development; positive regulation of cell population proliferation; positive regulation of osteoblast differentiation; activation of protein kinase B activity; insulin-like growth factor receptor signaling pathway; negative regulation of apoptotic process; positive regulation of tyrosine phosphorylation of STAT protein; regulation of signaling receptor activity; positive regulation of gene expression; negative regulation of gene expression; cellular response to amyloid-beta; positive regulation of vascular associated smooth muscle cell proliferation; negative regulation of vascular associated smooth muscle cell apoptotic process; negative regulation of interleukin-1 beta production; negative regulation of tumor necrosis factor production; negative regulation of neuroinflammatory response; negative regulation of amyloid-beta formation
Sources:Amigo / QuickGO
Orthologs
Databases	NCBI: entry; OMA: entry
Species	Human	Mouse
Entrez	3479	16000
Ensembl	ENSG00000017427	ENSMUSG00000020053
UniProt	P05019	P05017
RefSeq (mRNA)	NM_000618; NM_001111283; NM_001111284; NM_001111285	NM_001111274; NM_001111275; NM_001111276; NM_010512; NM_184052 NM_001314010
RefSeq (protein)	NP_000609; NP_001104753; NP_001104754; NP_001104755	NP_001104744; NP_001104745; NP_001104746; NP_001300939; NP_034642
Location (UCSC)	Chr 12: 102.4 – 102.48 Mb	Chr 10: 87.69 – 87.77 Mb
PubMed search
- Wikidata
View/Edit Human	View/Edit Mouse

Insulin-like growth factor 1 (IGF1), also called somatomedin C, is a hormone similar in molecular structure to insulin which plays an important role in childhood growth, and has anabolic effects in adults. In the 1950s IGF1 was called "sulfation factor" because it stimulated sulfation of cartilage in vitro, and in the 1970s due to its effects it was termed "nonsuppressible insulin-like activity" (NSILA).

IGF1 is a protein that in humans is encoded by the IGF1 gene. IGF1 consists of 70 amino acids in a single chain with three intramolecular disulfide bridges. IGF1 has a molecular weight of 7,649 daltons. In dogs, an ancient mutation in IGF1 is the primary cause of the toy phenotype.

IGF1 is produced primarily by the liver. Production is stimulated by growth hormone (GH). Most of IGF1 is bound to one of 6 binding proteins (IGF-BP). IGFBP-1 is regulated by insulin. IGF1 is produced throughout life; the highest rates of IGF1 production occur during the pubertal growth spurt. The lowest levels occur in infancy and old age.

Low IGF1 levels are associated with cardiovascular disease, while high IGF1 levels are associated with cancer. Mid-range IGF1 levels are associated with the lowest mortality.

A synthetic analog of IGF1, mecasermin, is used for the treatment of growth failure in children with severe IGF1 deficiency. Cyclic glycine-proline (cGP) is a metabolite of hormone insulin-like growth factor-1 (IGF1). It has a cyclic structure, lipophilic nature, and is enzymatically stable which makes it a more favourable candidate for manipulating the binding-release process between IGF1 and its binding protein, thereby normalising IGF1 function.

== Synthesis and circulation ==
The polypeptide hormone IGF1 is synthesized primarily in the liver upon stimulation by growth hormone (GH). It is a key mediator of anabolic activities in numerous tissues and cells, such as growth hormone-stimulated growth, metabolism and protein translation. Due to its participation in the GH-IGF1 axis it contributes among other things to the maintenance of muscle strength, muscle mass, development of the skeleton and is a key factor in brain, eye and lung development during fetal development.

Studies have shown the importance of the GH/IGF1 axis in directing development and growth, where mice with an IGF1 deficiency had a reduced body- and tissue mass. Mice with an excessive expression of IGF1 had an increased mass.

The levels of IGF1 in the body vary throughout life, depending on age, where peaks of the hormone is generally observed during puberty and the postnatal period. After puberty, when entering the third decade of life, there is a rapid decrease in IGF1 levels due to the actions of GH. Between the third and eighth decade of life, the IGF1 levels decrease gradually, but unrelated to functional decline. However, protein intake is proven to increase IGF1 levels.

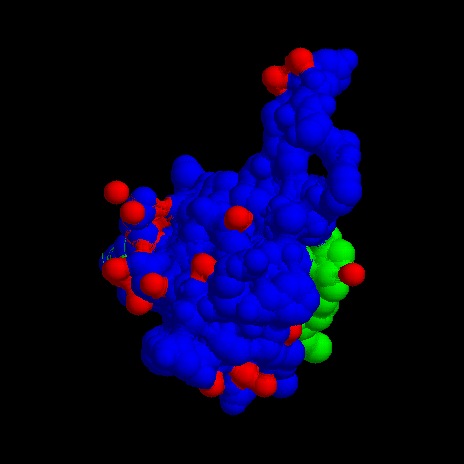
3-d model of IGF1

== Mechanism of action ==
IGF1 is a primary mediator of the effects of growth hormone (GH). Growth hormone is made in the anterior pituitary gland, released into the bloodstream, and then stimulates the liver to produce IGF1. IGF1 then stimulates systemic body growth, and has growth-promoting effects on almost every cell in the body, especially skeletal muscle, cartilage, bone, liver, kidney, nerve, skin, hematopoietic, and lung cells. In addition to its insulin-like effects (insulin being the main anabolic hormone in the body), IGF1 can also regulate cellular DNA synthesis.

IGF1 binds to at least two cell surface receptor tyrosine kinases: the IGF1 receptor (IGF1R), and the insulin receptor. Its primary action is mediated by binding to its specific receptor, IGF1R, which is present on the surface of several cell types in a multitude of tissues. Binding to the IGF1R initiates intracellular signaling. IGF1 is one of the most potent natural activators of the Akt signaling pathway, a stimulator of cell growth and proliferation, and a potent inhibitor of programmed cell death. The IGF1 receptor and insulin receptor are two closely related members of a transmembrane tetrameric tyrosine kinase receptor family. They control vital brain functions, such as survival, growth, energy metabolism, longevity, neuroprotection and neuroregeneration.

=== Metabolic effects ===
As a major growth factor, IGF1 is responsible for stimulating growth of all cell types, and causing significant metabolic effects. One important metabolic effect of IGF1 is signaling cells that sufficient nutrients are available for them to undergo hypertrophy and cell division. Its effects also include inhibiting cell apoptosis and increasing the production of cellular proteins. IGF1 receptors are ubiquitous, which allows for metabolic changes caused by IGF1 to occur in all cell types. IGF1's metabolic effects are far-reaching and can coordinate protein, carbohydrate, and fat metabolism in a variety of different cell types. The regulation of IGF1's metabolic effects on target tissues is also coordinated with other hormones such as growth hormone and insulin.

=== The IGF system ===
IGF1 is part of the insulin-like growth factor (IGF) system. This system consists of three ligands (insulin, IGF1 and IGF-2), two tyrosine kinase receptors (insulin receptor and IGF1R receptor) and six ligand binding proteins (IGFBP 1–6). Together they play an essential role in proliferation, survival, regulation of cell growth and affect almost every organ system in the body.

Similarly to IGF1, IGF2 is mainly produced in the liver and after it is released into circulation, it stimulates growth and cell proliferation. IGF2 is thought to be a fetal growth factor, as it is essential for a normal embryonic development and is highly expressed in embryonic and neonatal tissues.

=== Variants ===
A splice variant of IGF1 sharing an identical mature region, but with a different E domain is known as mechano growth factor (MGF).

== Related disorders ==
=== Laron syndrome ===
Laron syndrome (LS), also known as growth hormone insensitivity or growth hormone receptor deficiency (GHRD), is an autosomal recessive disorder characterized by a lack of insulin-like growth factor 1 (IGF-1; somatomedin-C) production in response to growth hormone (GH; hGH; somatotropin). It is usually caused by inherited growth hormone receptor (GHR) mutations. The syndrome is named after the scientist Zvi Laron who first discovered the syndrome in 1966.

Affected individuals classically present with short stature between −4 and −10 standard deviations below median height, obesity, craniofacial abnormalities, micropenis, low blood sugar, and low serum IGF-1 despite elevated basal serum GH.

LS is a very rare condition with a total of 250 known individuals worldwide. The genetic origins of these individuals have been traced back to Mediterranean, South Asian, and Semitic ancestors, with the latter group comprising the majority of cases. Molecular genetic testing for growth hormone receptor gene mutations confirms the diagnosis of LS, but clinical evaluation may include laboratory analysis of basal GH, IGF-1 and IGFBP levels, GH stimulation testing, and/or GH trial therapy.

People with LS are unresponsive to growth hormone therapy; the disease is instead treated mainly with recombinant IGF-1, Mecasermin.

Evidence has suggested that people with Laron syndrome have a reduced risk of developing cancer and diabetes mellitus type II, with a significantly reduced incidence and delayed age of onset of these diseases compared to their unaffected relatives. The molecular mechanisms of increased longevity and protection from age-related disease among people with LS is an area of active investigation.

=== Acromegaly ===
Acromegaly is a syndrome caused by the anterior pituitary gland producing excess growth hormone (GH). A number of disorders may increase the pituitary's GH output, although most commonly it involves a tumor called pituitary adenoma, derived from a distinct type of cell (somatotrophs). It leads to anatomical changes and metabolic dysfunction caused by elevated GH and IGF1 levels.

High level of IGF1 in acromegaly is related to an increased risk of some cancers, particularly colon cancer and thyroid cancer.

== Use as a diagnostic test ==
=== Growth hormone deficiency ===
IGF1 levels can be analyzed and used by physicians as a screening test for growth hormone deficiency (GHD), acromegaly and gigantism. However, IGF1 has been shown to be a bad diagnostic screening test for growth hormone deficiency.

The ratio of IGF1 and insulin-like growth factor-binding protein 3 has been shown to be a useful diagnostic test for GHD.

=== Liver fibrosis ===
Low serum IGF1 levels have been suggested as a biomarker for predicting fibrosis, but not steatosis, in people with metabolic dysfunction–associated steatotic liver disease.

== Causes of elevated IGF1 levels ==
- Medical conditions:
  - acromegaly (especially when GH is also high)
  - delayed puberty
  - pregnancy
  - hyperthyroidism
  - some rare tumors, such as carcinoids, secreting IGF1
- Diet:
  - High-protein diet
  - consumption of dairy products (except for cheese)
  - consumption of fish
- IGF1 assay problems

Calorie restriction has been found to have no effect on IGF1 levels.

== Causes of reduced IGF1 levels ==
- Metabolic dysfunction–associated steatotic liver disease, especially at advanced stages of steatohepatitis and fibrosis
- Oral estrogens suppress growth hormone-induced IGF1 production in the liver by antagonism of growth hormone receptors.

== Health effects ==
=== Mortality ===
Both high and low levels of IGF1 increase mortality risk, with the mid‐range (120–160 ng/ml) being associated with the lowest mortality.

==== Dairy consumption ====
It has been suggested that consumption of IGF1 in dairy products could increase cancer risk, particularly prostate cancer. However, significant levels of intact IGF1 from oral consumption are not absorbed as they are digested by gastric enzymes. IGF1 present in food is not expected to be active within the body in the way that IGF1 is produced by the body itself.

The Food and Drug Administration has stated that IGF-I concentrations in milk are not significant when evaluated against concentrations of IGF-I endogenously produced in humans.

A 2018 review by the Committee on Carcinogenicity of Chemicals in Food, Consumer Products and the Environment (COC) concluded that there is "insufficient evidence to draw any firm conclusions as to whether exposure to dietary IGF1 is associated with an increased incidence of cancer in consumers". Certain dairy processes such as fermentation are known to significantly decrease IGF1 concentrations. The British Dietetic Association has described the idea that milk promotes hormone related cancerous tumor growth as a myth, stating "no link between dairy containing diets and risk of cancer or promoting cancer growth as a result of hormones".

=== Cardiovascular disease ===
Increased IGF1 levels are associated with a 16% lower risk of cardiovascular disease and a 28% reduction of cardiovascular events.

=== Diabetes ===
Low IGF1 levels are shown to increase the risk of developing type 2 diabetes and insulin resistance. On the other hand, a high IGF1 bioavailability in people with diabetes may delay or prevent diabetes-associated complications, as it improves impaired small blood vessel function.

IGF1 has been characterized as an insulin sensitizer.

Low serum IGF1 levels can be considered an indicator of liver fibrosis in type 2 diabetes mellitus patients.

== See also ==
- Somatopause
