= Vesugen =

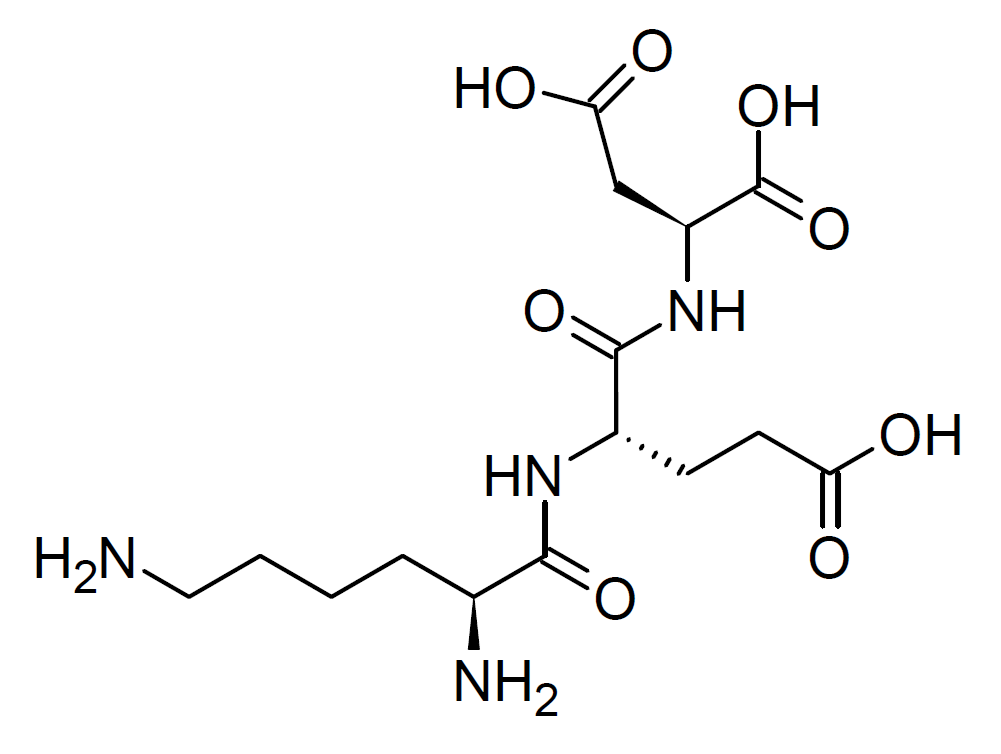

Identifiers
- IUPAC name: (2S)-2-[[(2S)-4-carboxy-2-[[(2S)-2,6-diaminohexanoyl]amino]butanoyl]amino]butanedioic acid
- CAS Number: 204271-66-9
- PubChem CID: 87571363
- ChemSpider: 16572739
- ChEBI: CHEBI:159909

Chemical and physical data
- Formula: C_{15}H_{26}N_{4}O_{8}
- Molar mass: 390.393 g·mol^{−1}
- 3D model (JSmol): Interactive image
- SMILES: C(CCN)C[C@@H](C(=O)N[C@@H](CCC(=O)O)C(=O)N[C@@H](CC(=O)O)C(=O)O)N
- InChI: InChI=1S/C15H26N4O8/c16-6-2-1-3-8(17)13(24)18-9(4-5-11(20)21)14(25)19-10(15(26)27)7-12(22)23/h8-10H,1-7,16-17H2,(H,18,24)(H,19,25)(H,20,21)(H,22,23)(H,26,27)/t8-,9-,10-/m0/s1; Key:LLSUNJYOSCOOEB-GUBZILKMSA-N

Vesugen (T-38) is a tripeptide with the sequence KED or Lys-Glu-Asp. It is one of a number of small peptides developed in Russia in the late 1990s and early 2000s which are purported to have anti-aging effects. Vesugen is claimed to stimulate proliferation and protein synthesis in fibroblast cells in the skin and to improve the appearance of skin, as well as promoting neurotropic effects in brain tissue, giving it a similar pharmacological profile to those claimed for the matrikine peptides produced by Western cosmetic skincare companies.

== See also ==
- Cibinetide
- Cortagen
- Epitalon
- GHK-Cu
- KPV tripeptide
- Livagen
- Pinealon
- Vladimir Khavinson
