= Bronchogen =

Identifiers
- IUPAC name: (2S)-2-[[(2S)-2-[[(2S)-2-[[(2S)-2-aminopropanoyl]amino]-4-carboxybutanoyl]amino]-3-carboxypropanoyl]amino]-4-methylpentanoic acid
- CAS Number: 857267-12-0
- PubChem CID: 11690869

Chemical and physical data
- Formula: C_{18}H_{30}N_{4}O_{9}
- Molar mass: 446.457 g·mol^{−1}
- 3D model (JSmol): Interactive image
- SMILES: C[C@@H](C(=O)N[C@@H](CCC(=O)O)C(=O)N[C@@H](CC(=O)O)C(=O)N[C@@H](CC(C)C)C(=O)O)N
- InChI: InChI=1S/C18H30N4O9/c1-8(2)6-12(18(30)31)22-17(29)11(7-14(25)26)21-16(28)10(4-5-13(23)24)20-15(27)9(3)19/h8-12H,4-7,19H2,1-3H3,(H,20,27)(H,21,28)(H,22,29)(H,23,24)(H,25,26)(H,30,31)/t9-,10-,11-,12-/m0/s1; Key:OFZRHTIWKZWPQF-BJDJZHNGSA-N

Bronchogen is a tetrapeptide with the sequence AEDL or Ala-Glu-Asp-Leu. It has antiinflammatory effects and is claimed to be of therapeutic effect in conditions involving inflammation of bronchial epithelial cells in the lungs, such as chronic obstructive pulmonary disease (COPD), although essentially all evidence for its efficacy is derived from Russian research using rats and mice rather than human clinical trials.

== See also ==
- Cortagen
- Epitalon
- GPE
- KPV tripeptide
- Livagen
- Pinealon
- Vladimir Khavinson
