= Cibinetide =

Erythropoietin receptor agonist

Clinical data
- Other names: ARA-290; ARA290; PHBSP; pHBSP peptide; pGlu-Glu-Gln-Leu-Glu-Arg-Ala-Leu-Asn-Ser-Ser; Pyroglutamate helix B surface peptide; UEQLERALNSS
- Drug class: Erythropoietin receptor agonist

Identifiers
- IUPAC name: (4S)-5-[[(2S)-5-amino-1-[[(2S)-1-[[(2S)-1-[[(2S)-1-[[(2S)-1-[[(2S)-1-[[(2S)-4-amino-1-[[(2S)-1-[[(1S)-1-carboxy-2-hydroxyethyl]amino]-3-hydroxy-1-oxopropan-2-yl]amino]-1,4-dioxobutan-2-yl]amino]-4-methyl-1-oxopentan-2-yl]amino]-1-oxopropan-2-yl]amino]-5-(diaminomethylideneamino)-1-oxopentan-2-yl]amino]-4-carboxy-1-oxobutan-2-yl]amino]-4-methyl-1-oxopentan-2-yl]amino]-1,5-dioxopentan-2-yl]amino]-5-oxo-4-[[(2S)-5-oxopyrrolidine-2-carbonyl]amino]pentanoic acid
- CAS Number: 1208243-50-8
- PubChem CID: 91810664
- DrugBank: DB13006
- ChemSpider: 35013013
- UNII: 9W5677JKDA
- KEGG: D11218
- ChEMBL: ChEMBL3545305

Chemical and physical data
- Formula: C_{51}H_{84}N_{16}O_{21}
- Molar mass: 1257.324 g·mol^{−1}
- 3D model (JSmol): Interactive image
- SMILES: C[C@@H](C(=O)N[C@@H](CC(C)C)C(=O)N[C@@H](CC(=O)N)C(=O)N[C@@H](CO)C(=O)N[C@@H](CO)C(=O)O)NC(=O)[C@H](CCCN=C(N)N)NC(=O)[C@H](CCC(=O)O)NC(=O)[C@H](CC(C)C)NC(=O)[C@H](CCC(=O)N)NC(=O)[C@H](CCC(=O)O)NC(=O)[C@@H]1CCC(=O)N1
- InChI: InChI=1S/C51H84N16O21/c1-22(2)17-30(47(84)65-32(19-36(53)71)48(85)66-33(20-68)49(86)67-34(21-69)50(87)88)63-40(77)24(5)57-41(78)25(7-6-16-56-51(54)55)59-43(80)29(11-15-39(75)76)62-46(83)31(18-23(3)4)64-45(82)27(8-12-35(52)70)60-44(81)28(10-14-38(73)74)61-42(79)26-9-13-37(72)58-26/h22-34,68-69H,6-21H2,1-5H3,(H2,52,70)(H2,53,71)(H,57,78)(H,58,72)(H,59,80)(H,60,81)(H,61,79)(H,62,83)(H,63,77)(H,64,82)(H,65,84)(H,66,85)(H,67,86)(H,73,74)(H,75,76)(H,87,88)(H4,54,55,56)/t24-,25-,26-,27-,28-,29-,30-,31-,32-,33-,34-/m0/s1; Key:WZTIQQBMSJTRBR-WYKNNRPVSA-N

Cibinetide (INN; USAN; developmental code name ARA-290) is an erythropoietin receptor agonist which is under development for the treatment of a variety of different medical conditions. It was under development for the treatment of depressive disorders, but development for this indication was discontinued. The drug is under development by Araim Pharmaceuticals. Modified derivatives with a longer duration of action have also been developed.

== See also ==
- Cortagen
- FGL-S
- Selank
- Semax
- Vesugen
