= Livagen =

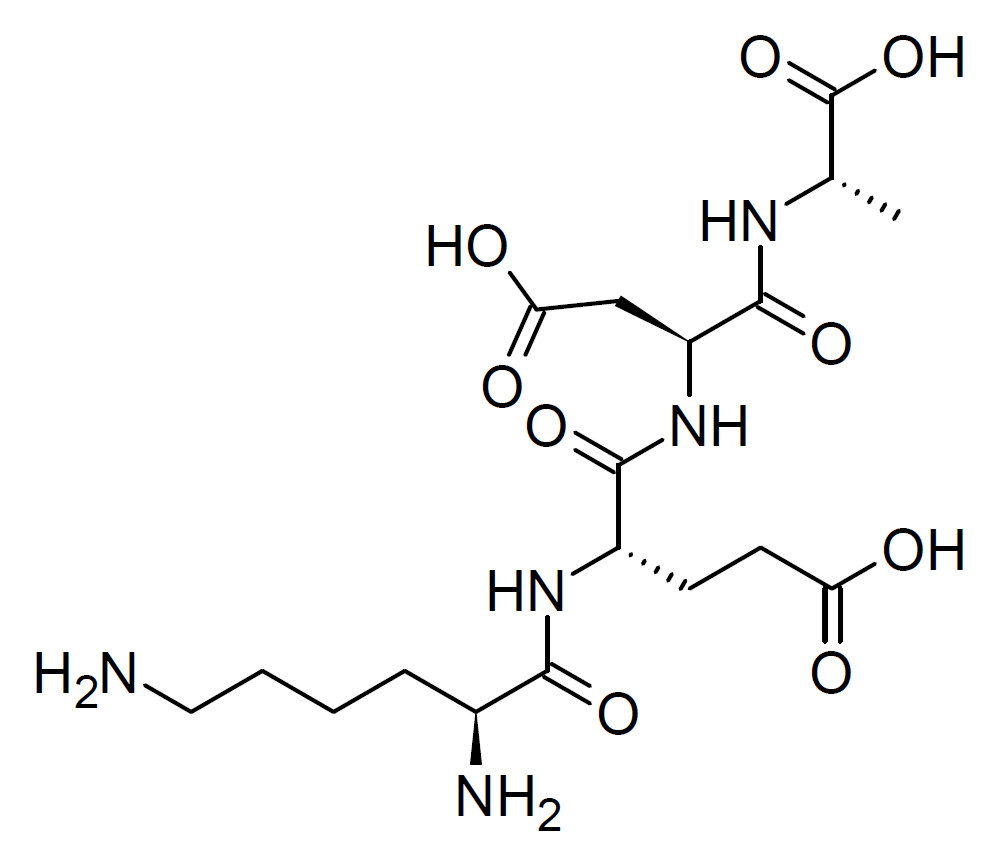

Identifiers
- IUPAC name: (4S)-5-[[(2S)-3-carboxy-1-[[(1S)-1-carboxyethyl]amino]-1-oxopropan-2-yl]amino]-4-[[(2S)-2,6-diaminohexanoyl]amino]-5-oxopentanoic acid
- PubChem CID: 87919683
- ChemSpider: 57489559

Chemical and physical data
- Formula: C_{18}H_{31}N_{5}O_{9}
- Molar mass: 461.472 g·mol^{−1}
- 3D model (JSmol): Interactive image
- SMILES: C[C@@H](C(=O)O)NC(=O)[C@H](CC(=O)O)NC(=O)[C@H](CCC(=O)O)NC(=O)[C@H](CCCCN)N
- InChI: InChI=1S/C18H31N5O9/c1-9(18(31)32)21-17(30)12(8-14(26)27)23-16(29)11(5-6-13(24)25)22-15(28)10(20)4-2-3-7-19/h9-12H,2-8,19-20H2,1H3,(H,21,30)(H,22,28)(H,23,29)(H,24,25)(H,26,27)(H,31,32)/t9-,10-,11-,12-/m0/s1; Key:IKVDKWACACMDLR-BJDJZHNGSA-N

Livagen is a tetrapeptide with the sequence KEDA or Lys-Glu-Asp-Ala. It is one of a number of small peptides developed in Russia in the late 1990s and early 2000s which have antiinflammatory and purported anti-aging effects, and are now widely sold over the internet as anti-aging products though with relatively limited evidence to support these claims.

== See also ==
- Angiotensin (1-7)
- Bronchogen
- Cortagen
- Epitalon
- GHK-Cu
- GPE
- KPV tripeptide
- Pinealon
- Proxofim
- SVT-NH-ethyl
- Vesugen
- Vladimir Khavinson
