= FGL-S =

Chemical and physical data
- Formula: C_{47}H_{82}N_{16}O_{18}
- Molar mass: 1159.267 g·mol^{−1}
- 3D model (JSmol): Interactive image
- SMILES: OC(=O)[C@H](C)NC(=O)[C@@H](NC(=O)[C@@H](NC(=O)[C@H](CCCCN)NC(=O)CNC(=O)[C@@H](NC(=O)[C@@H](NC(=O)[C@@H](NC(=O)[C@@H](NC(=O)[C@H](C)NC(=O)[C@@H](N)C(C)C)CCC(O)=O)CC(=O)N)CCC(=O)N)CCC(=O)N)CO)CCCCN
- InChI: InChI=InChI=1S/C47H82N16O18/c1-22(2)37(53)46(79)55-23(3)38(71)58-29(13-16-36(69)70)43(76)62-30(19-34(52)67)44(77)61-28(12-15-33(51)66)42(75)60-27(11-14-32(50)65)39(72)54-20-35(68)57-25(9-5-7-17-48)41(74)63-31(21-64)45(78)59-26(10-6-8-18-49)40(73)56-24(4)47(80)81/h22-31,37,64H,5-21,48-49,53H2,1-4H3,(H2,50,65)(H2,51,66)(H2,52,67)(H,54,72)(H,55,79)(H,56,73)(H,57,68)(H,58,71)(H,59,78)(H,60,75)(H,61,77)(H,62,76)(H,63,74)(H,69,70)(H,80,81)/t23-,24-,25-,26-,27-,28-,29-,30-,31-,37-/m0/s1; Key:IXCDXKRAQYHCEO-DIGNQEHISA-N

FGL-S (FGL_{S}) is a polypeptide 11 amino acids in length, with the sequence VAENQQGKSKA or Val-Ala-Glu-Asn-Gln-Gln-Gly-Lys-Ser-Lys-Ala. It is a modified fragment derived from the endogenous signalling protein neural cell adhesion molecule, and has antidepressant and anxiolytic effects in animal models.

== See also ==
- Cibinetide
- Cortagen
- Epitalon
- Semax
- Selank
