= Carlos Ferrario =

Argentine-American cardiologist and medical researcher

Carlos M. Ferrario
- Born: Carlos María Ferrario
- Citizenship: Argentine-American
- Education: University of Buenos Aires (MD, 1963); University of Gothenburg; Karolinska Institute
- Known for: Research on the renin–angiotensin system; characterisation of angiotensin (1-7)
- Scientific career
- Fields: Cardiology, Hypertension
- Workplaces: Wake Forest University School of Medicine

Carlos María Ferrario is an Argentine-American cardiologist and researcher. He is Emeritus Professor at Atrium Health Wake Forest Baptist, Wake Forest University School of Medicine, in Winston-Salem, North Carolina. His research has focused on the renin–angiotensin system (RAS) and its role in hypertension and cardiovascular disease.

He is a Fellow of the American College of Cardiology (FACC), the American Heart Association (FAHA), the American Society of Hypertension (FASH), the American Physiological Society (FAPS), and the International Society of Hypertension. He is a co-founder and past president of the Inter-American Society of Hypertension. His work has accumulated over 53,000 citations with an h-index of 118 according to Google Scholar.

== Early life and education ==
Ferrario graduated from the University of Buenos Aires School of Medicine in 1963. He subsequently undertook postgraduate training in cardiology at the University of Gothenburg and the Karolinska Institute in Sweden between 1964 and 1966.

== Career ==
In 1966, Ferrario joined Irvine H. Page at The Cleveland Clinic Foundation in Ohio, where Page was conducting research on hypertension. Ferrario chaired the Department of Brain and Vascular Research at the Cleveland Clinic Foundation from 1984 to 1992, and served on the Cleveland Clinic Board of Governors from 1985 to 1990.

In 1992, Ferrario founded the Hypertension and Vascular Research Center at Wake Forest University School of Medicine, directing it until 2009. He holds the title of emeritus professor at Atrium Health Wake Forest Baptist.

== Research ==
Ferrario's research has examined the renin–angiotensin system and its involvement in blood pressure regulation and cardiovascular disease.

Ferrario contributed to the identification and characterisation of angiotensin (1-7) [Ang-(1-7)], a peptide within the renin–angiotensin system. His work examined how this peptide promotes vasodilation and may counteract the vasoconstrictive and profibrotic effects of angiotensin II.

Ferrario's laboratory studied angiotensin-converting enzyme 2 (ACE2) and its relationship to blood pressure regulation. His research examined the role of ACE2 in generating angiotensin-(1-7) and investigated how this pathway may affect inflammatory and fibrotic processes in cardiovascular disease. This work attracted broader attention during the COVID-19 pandemic, as ACE2 was identified as the cellular receptor for SARS-CoV-2.

Ferrario's research contributed to expanding the understanding of the renin–angiotensin system beyond blood pressure control, examining its involvement in inflammation, immune responses, tissue remodelling, and organ protection.

== Awards and honours ==
Year	Award	Awarding organisation
1998	Ignacio Chaves Centennial Gold Medal of Honor	National University of Mexico
1999	Angiotensin II Investigator of the Year	European Society of Hypertension
2001	Harry Goldblatt Award	AHA Council on Hypertension
2001	Robert Tigerstedt Award	American Society of Hypertension
2001	Lifetime Achievement Award	Inter-American Society of Hypertension
2007	Corcoran Award	AHA Council on Hypertension
2008	R. Tigerstedt Award	Finnish Society of Hypertension
2008	J. Wright Award	Australian Society of Hypertension
2009	Novartis Award for Hypertension Research	AHA Council of High Blood Pressure Research
2023	Distinguished Scientist	American Heart Association
2024	Robert D. and Alma W. Moreton Research Award	Southern Medical Association
