= Cartalax =

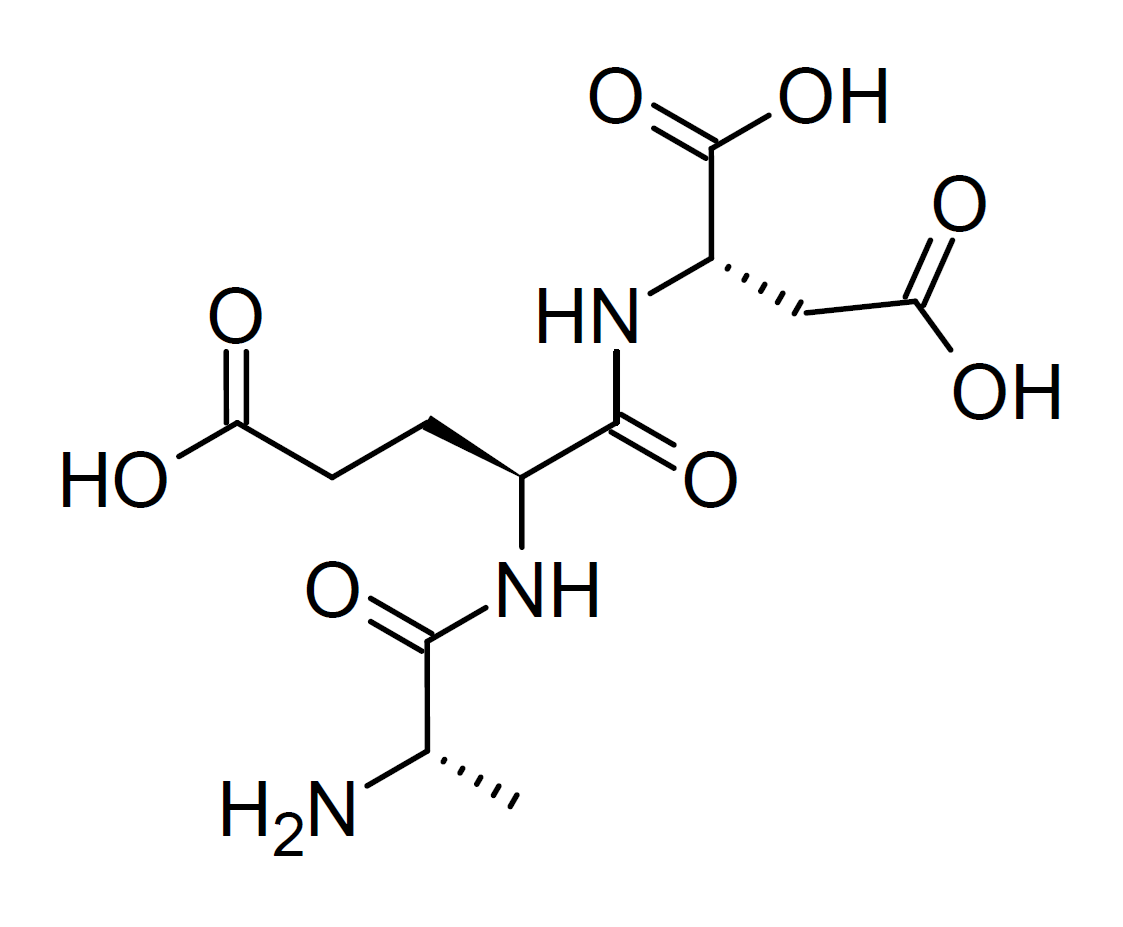

Identifiers
- IUPAC name: (2S)-2-[[(2S)-2-[[(2S)-2-aminopropanoyl]amino]-4-carboxybutanoyl]amino]butanedioic acid
- PubChem CID: 87815447
- ChemSpider: 16568512
- ChEBI: CHEBI:158137

Chemical and physical data
- Formula: C_{12}H_{19}N_{3}O_{8}
- Molar mass: 333.297 g·mol^{−1}
- 3D model (JSmol): Interactive image
- SMILES: C[C@@H](C(=O)N[C@@H](CCC(=O)O)C(=O)N[C@@H](CC(=O)O)C(=O)O)N
- InChI: InChI=1S/C12H19N3O8/c1-5(13)10(20)14-6(2-3-8(16)17)11(21)15-7(12(22)23)4-9(18)19/h5-7H,2-4,13H2,1H3,(H,14,20)(H,15,21)(H,16,17)(H,18,19)(H,22,23)/t5-,6-,7-/m0/s1; Key:KXEVYGKATAMXJJ-ACZMJKKPSA-N

Cartalax (Ala-Glu-Asp, T-31, AED) is a tripeptide derivative developed in Russia. It has anti-aging effects in vitro and in animal models, and has been sold in Russian-speaking countries as well as more broadly over the internet as a supposed treatment for conditions such as arthritis, though only limited studies in humans have been published.

== See also ==
- BPC-157
- Epitalon
- GHK-Cu
- KPV tripeptide
- Link-N
- Pinealon
- TB-500
- Vladimir Khavinson
