= FOXO4-DRI =

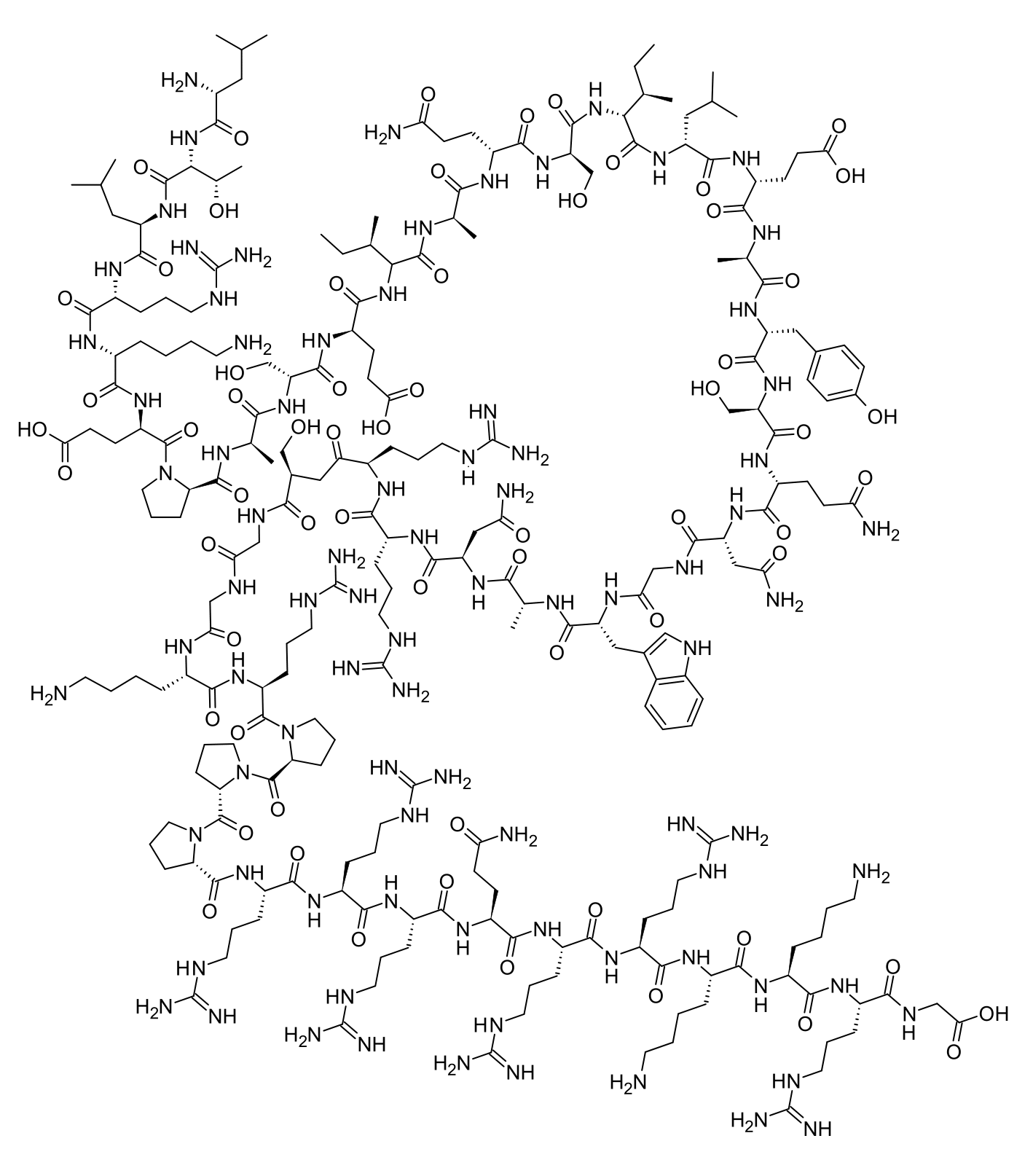

Identifiers
- IUPAC name: (4R)-5-[[(2R)-1-[[(2R)-1-[[(2R)-1-[[(2R)-5-amino-1-[[(2R)-4-amino-1-[[2-[[(2R)-1-[[(2R)-1-[[(2R)-4-amino-1-[[(2R)-1-[[(2R)-1-[[(2R)-1-[[2-[[2-[[(2R)-6-amino-1-[[(2R)-1-[(2R)-2-[(2R)-2-[(2R)-2-[[(2R)-1-[[(2R)-1-[[(2R)-1-[[(2R)-5-amino-1-[[(2R)-1-[[(2R)-1-[[(2R)-6-amino-1-[[(2R)-6-amino-1-[[(2R)-5-carbamimidamido-1-(carboxymethylamino)-1-oxopentan-2-yl]amino]-1-oxohexan-2-yl]amino]-1-oxohexan-2-yl]amino]-5-carbamimidamido-1-oxopentan-2-yl]amino]-5-carbamimidamido-1-oxopentan-2-yl]amino]-1,5-dioxopentan-2-yl]amino]-5-carbamimidamido-1-oxopentan-2-yl]amino]-5-carbamimidamido-1-oxopentan-2-yl]amino]-5-carbamimidamido-1-oxopentan-2-yl]carbamoyl]pyrrolidine-1-carbonyl]pyrrolidine-1-carbonyl]pyrrolidin-1-yl]-5-carbamimidamido-1-oxopentan-2-yl]amino]-1-oxohexan-2-yl]amino]-2-oxoethyl]amino]-2-oxoethyl]amino]-3-hydroxy-1-oxopropan-2-yl]amino]-5-carbamimidamido-1-oxopentan-2-yl]amino]-5-carbamimidamido-1-oxopentan-2-yl]amino]-1,4-dioxobutan-2-yl]amino]-1-oxopropan-2-yl]amino]-3-(1H-indol-3-yl)-1-oxopropan-2-yl]amino]-2-oxoethyl]amino]-1,4-dioxobutan-2-yl]amino]-1,5-dioxopentan-2-yl]amino]-3-hydroxy-1-oxopropan-2-yl]amino]-3-(4-hydroxyphenyl)-1-oxopropan-2-yl]amino]-1-oxopropan-2-yl]amino]-4-[[(2R)-2-[[(2R,3R)-2-[[(2R)-2-[[(2R)-5-amino-2-[[(2R)-2-[[(2R,3R)-2-[[(2R)-2-[[(2R)-2-[[(2R)-2-[[(2R)-1-[(2R)-2-[[(2R)-6-amino-2-[[(2R)-2-[[(2R)-2-[[(2R,3S)-2-[[(2R)-2-amino-4-methylpentanoyl]amino]-3-hydroxybutanoyl]amino]-4-methylpentanoyl]amino]-5-carbamimidamidopentanoyl]amino]hexanoyl]amino]-4-carboxybutanoyl]pyrrolidine-2-carbonyl]amino]propanoyl]amino]-3-hydroxypropanoyl]amino]-4-carboxybutanoyl]amino]-3-methylpentanoyl]amino]propanoyl]amino]-5-oxopentanoyl]amino]-3-hydroxypropanoyl]amino]-3-methylpentanoyl]amino]-4-methylpentanoyl]amino]-5-oxopentanoic acid
- CAS Number: 2460055-10-9
- PubChem CID: 167312269
- ChemSpider: 129428086

Chemical and physical data
- Formula: C_{228}H_{388}N_{86}O_{64}
- Molar mass: 5358.150 g·mol^{−1}
- 3D model (JSmol): Interactive image
- SMILES: CC[C@@H](C)[C@H](C(=O)N[C@H](C)C(=O)N[C@H](CCC(=O)N)C(=O)N[C@H](CO)C(=O)N[C@H]([C@H](C)CC)C(=O)N[C@H](CC(C)C)C(=O)N[C@H](CCC(=O)O)C(=O)N[C@H](C)C(=O)N[C@H](CC1=CC=C(C=C1)O)C(=O)N[C@H](CO)C(=O)N[C@H](CCC(=O)N)C(=O)N[C@H](CC(=O)N)C(=O)NCC(=O)N[C@H](CC2=CNC3=CC=CC=C32)C(=O)N[C@H](C)C(=O)N[C@H](CC(=O)N)C(=O)N[C@H](CCCNC(=N)N)C(=O)N[C@H](CCCNC(=N)N)C(=O)N[C@H](CO)C(=O)NCC(=O)NCC(=O)N[C@H](CCCCN)C(=O)N[C@H](CCCNC(=N)N)C(=O)N4CCC[C@@H]4C(=O)N5CCC[C@@H]5C(=O)N6CCC[C@@H]6C(=O)N[C@H](CCCNC(=N)N)C(=O)N[C@H](CCCNC(=N)N)C(=O)N[C@H](CCCNC(=N)N)C(=O)N[C@H](CCC(=O)N)C(=O)N[C@H](CCCNC(=N)N)C(=O)N[C@H](CCCNC(=N)N)C(=O)N[C@H](CCCCN)C(=O)N[C@H](CCCCN)C(=O)N[C@H](CCCNC(=N)N)C(=O)NCC(=O)O)NC(=O)[C@@H](CCC(=O)O)NC(=O)[C@@H](CO)NC(=O)[C@@H](C)NC(=O)[C@H]7CCCN7C(=O)[C@@H](CCC(=O)O)NC(=O)[C@@H](CCCCN)NC(=O)[C@@H](CCCNC(=N)N)NC(=O)[C@@H](CC(C)C)NC(=O)[C@@H]([C@H](C)O)NC(=O)[C@@H](CC(C)C)N
- InChI: InChI=1S/C228H388N86O64/c1-16-115(9)174(308-201(361)145(70-76-171(331)332)295-207(367)155(109-316)304-180(340)119(13)276-210(370)158-58-38-92-311(158)216(376)147(71-77-172(333)334)298-196(356)132(47-23-27-81-232)284-192(352)137(53-33-87-264-224(249)250)290-203(363)149(98-114(7)8)303-214(374)176(121(15)319)310-181(341)126(233)96-112(3)4)212(372)277-120(14)177(337)280-141(66-72-162(234)321)200(360)306-157(111-318)209(369)309-175(116(10)17-2)213(373)302-148(97-113(5)6)204(364)293-144(69-75-170(329)330)185(345)274-117(11)178(338)299-150(99-122-62-64-124(320)65-63-122)205(365)307-156(110-317)208(368)294-143(68-74-164(236)323)199(359)301-152(101-165(237)324)183(343)272-106-169(328)279-151(100-123-103-269-127-43-19-18-42-125(123)127)202(362)275-118(12)179(339)300-153(102-166(238)325)206(366)291-138(54-34-88-265-225(251)252)193(353)288-139(55-35-89-266-226(253)254)197(357)305-154(108-315)184(344)271-104-167(326)270-105-168(327)278-129(44-20-24-78-229)186(346)297-146(57-37-91-268-228(257)258)215(375)313-94-40-60-160(313)218(378)314-95-41-61-161(314)217(377)312-93-39-59-159(312)211(371)296-140(56-36-90-267-227(255)256)195(355)287-134(50-30-84-261-221(243)244)190(350)286-136(52-32-86-263-223(247)248)194(354)292-142(67-73-163(235)322)198(358)289-135(51-31-85-262-222(245)246)191(351)285-133(49-29-83-260-220(241)242)189(349)283-131(46-22-26-80-231)188(348)282-130(45-21-25-79-230)187(347)281-128(48-28-82-259-219(239)240)182(342)273-107-173(335)336/h18-19,42-43,62-65,103,112-121,126,128-161,174-176,269,315-320H,16-17,20-41,44-61,66-102,104-111,229-233H2,1-15H3,(H2,234,321)(H2,235,322)(H2,236,323)(H2,237,324)(H2,238,325)(H,270,326)(H,271,344)(H,272,343)(H,273,342)(H,274,345)(H,275,362)(H,276,370)(H,277,372)(H,278,327)(H,279,328)(H,280,337)(H,281,347)(H,282,348)(H,283,349)(H,284,352)(H,285,351)(H,286,350)(H,287,355)(H,288,353)(H,289,358)(H,290,363)(H,291,366)(H,292,354)(H,293,364)(H,294,368)(H,295,367)(H,296,371)(H,297,346)(H,298,356)(H,299,338)(H,300,339)(H,301,359)(H,302,373)(H,303,374)(H,304,340)(H,305,357)(H,306,360)(H,307,365)(H,308,361)(H,309,369)(H,310,341)(H,329,330)(H,331,332)(H,333,334)(H,335,336)(H4,239,240,259)(H4,241,242,260)(H4,243,244,261)(H4,245,246,262)(H4,247,248,263)(H4,249,250,264)(H4,251,252,265)(H4,253,254,266)(H4,255,256,267)(H4,257,258,268)/t115-,116-,117-,118-,119-,120-,121+,126-,128-,129-,130-,131-,132-,133-,134-,135-,136-,137-,138-,139-,140-,141-,142-,143-,144-,145-,146-,147-,148-,149-,150-,151-,152-,153-,154-,155-,156-,157-,158-,159-,160-,161-,174-,175-,176-/m1/s1; Key:WVZCDZFJLXBWHG-XXZPGMBKSA-N

FOXO4-DRI (Proxofim) is a synthetic peptide derivative that is described as an all D-enantiomer retro-inverso peptide It blocks the activity of Forkhead box protein O4 (FOXO4), a transcription factor which is elevated in senescent cells, and helps maintain their viability. Blocking FOXO4, which inhibits the activation of P53, causes senescent cells to undergo apoptosis by P53 activation, without affecting healthy cells around them, and has anti-aging effects which may have potential applications in the treatment of numerous age-related diseases, as well as an adjunct to treatment for certain forms of cancer. It has the sequence H-ltlrkepaseiaqsileaysqngwanrrsggkrppprrrqrrkkrg-OH.

== See also ==
- Cortagen
- Epitalon
- Livagen
- Tertomotide
