= Peptidyl-dipeptidase B =

Class of enzymes

Identifiers
- EC no.: 3.4.15.4
- CAS no.: 147014-93-5

Databases
- IntEnz: IntEnz view
- BRENDA: BRENDA entry
- ExPASy: NiceZyme view
- KEGG: KEGG entry
- MetaCyc: metabolic pathway
- PRIAM: profile
- PDB structures: RCSB PDB PDBe PDBsum
Search
- PMC: articles
- PubMed: articles
- NCBI: proteins

Peptidyl-dipeptidase B (EC 3.4.15.4, dipeptidyl carboxyhydrolase, atriopeptin convertase, atrial di-(tri)peptidyl carboxyhydrolase, peptidyldipeptidase B, atrial dipeptidyl carboxyhydrolase, atrial peptide convertase) is an enzyme. It catalyses the following chemical reaction

Release of a C-terminal dipeptide or exceptionally a tripeptide

This membrane-bound, zinc metallopeptidase is located in mammalian atrial myocytes.
