= CyRL-QN15 =

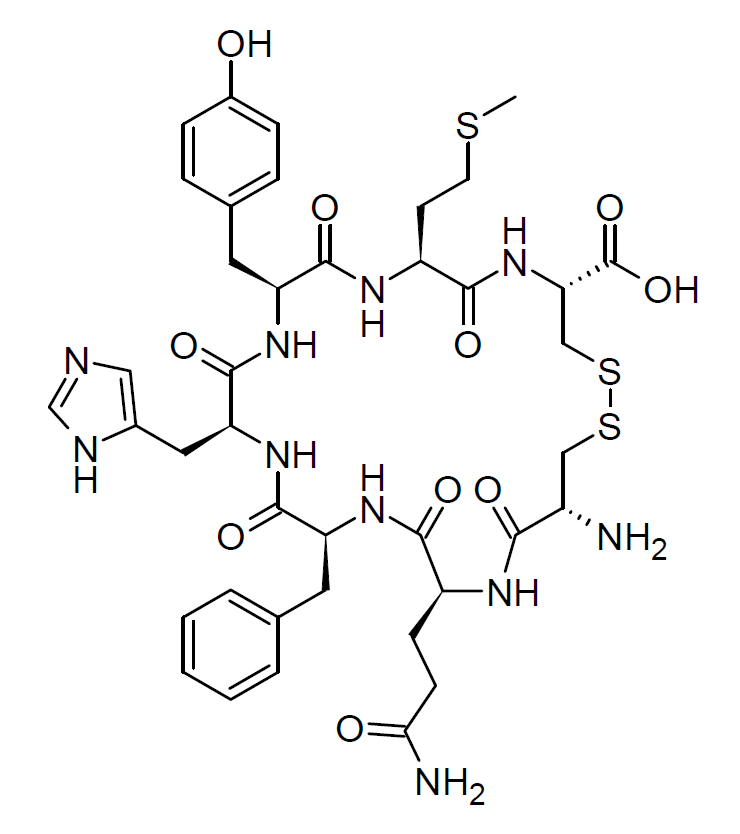

Chemical and physical data
- Formula: C_{40}H_{52}N_{10}O_{10}S_{3}
- Molar mass: 929.10 g·mol^{−1}
- 3D model (JSmol): Interactive image
- SMILES: O=C(O)[C@H]1NC(=O)[C@@H](NC(=O)[C@@H](NC(=O)[C@@H](NC(=O)[C@@H](NC(=O)[C@@H](NC(=O)[C@@H](N)CSSC1)CCC(=O)N)Cc1ccccc1)Cc1[NH]cnc1)Cc1ccc(O)cc1)CCSC
- InChI: InChI=InChI=1S/C40H52N10O10S3/c1-61-14-13-28-36(55)50-32(40(59)60)20-63-62-19-26(41)34(53)45-27(11-12-33(42)52)35(54)47-29(15-22-5-3-2-4-6-22)38(57)49-31(17-24-18-43-21-44-24)39(58)48-30(37(56)46-28)16-23-7-9-25(51)10-8-23/h2-10,18,21,26-32,51H,11-17,19-20,41H2,1H3,(H2,42,52)(H,43,44)(H,45,53)(H,46,56)(H,47,54)(H,48,58)(H,49,57)(H,50,55)(H,59,60)/t26-,27-,28-,29-,30-,31-,32-/m0/s1; Key:CDGOXQBMPZQUIZ-YYGRSCHNSA-N

CyRL-QN15 is a cyclic heptapeptide derivative with the sequence CQFHYMC, linked by a disulphide bond between the two cysteine residues. It was derived from peptides found in the skin of the frog Rana limnocharis. It enhances wound healing and has been researched for the treatment of diabetic ulcers. It has several different mechanisms of action, including acting as an antagonist at TLR4 and indirectly activating SIRT1.

== See also ==
- AL-VI10
- Cathelicidin antimicrobial peptide
- CI5 (peptide)
- Dermorphin
- GHK-Cu
- GPE
- PEPITEM
- PNC-27
- SVT-NH-ethyl
