= PTD4-PI3KAc =

Chemical and physical data
- Formula: C_{89}H_{142}N_{31}O_{34}PS_{2}
- Molar mass: 2285.39 g·mol^{−1}
- 3D model (JSmol): Interactive image
- SMILES: NC(=N)NCCC[C@H](NC(=O)[C@H](C)NC(=O)[C@H](C)NC(=O)[C@H](C)NC(=O)[C@H](CCCNC(N)=N)NC(=O)[C@H](C)NC(=O)[C@@H](N)Cc1ccc(O)cc1)C(=O)N[C@@H](CCC(N)=O)C(=O)N[C@@H](C)C(=O)N[C@@H](CCCNC(N)=N)C(=O)N[C@@H](C)C(=O)NCC(=O)N[C@@H](CO)C(=O)N[C@@H](CC(=O)O)C(=O)NCC(=O)NCC(=O)N[C@@H](Cc1ccc(cc1)OP(O)(O)=O)C(=O)N[C@@H](CCSC)C(=O)N[C@@H](CC(O)=O)C(=O)N[C@@H](CCSC)C(=O)N[C@@H](CO)C(=O)O
- InChI: InChI=InChI=1S/C89H142N31O34PS2/c1-41(69(132)102-38-66(127)111-61(39-121)85(148)118-59(34-67(128)129)76(139)103-36-64(125)101-37-65(126)110-58(33-48-17-21-50(22-18-48)154-155(151,152)153)83(146)116-56(25-30-156-7)81(144)119-60(35-68(130)131)84(147)117-57(26-31-157-8)82(145)120-62(40-122)86(149)150)107-77(140)52(12-9-27-98-87(92)93)113-74(137)46(6)109-79(142)55(23-24-63(91)124)115-80(143)54(14-11-29-100-89(96)97)114-72(135)44(4)105-70(133)42(2)104-71(134)43(3)108-78(141)53(13-10-28-99-88(94)95)112-73(136)45(5)106-75(138)51(90)32-47-15-19-49(123)20-16-47/h15-22,41-46,51-62,121-123H,9-14,23-40,90H2,1-8H3,(H2,91,124)(H,101,125)(H,102,132)(H,103,139)(H,104,134)(H,105,133)(H,106,138)(H,107,140)(H,108,141)(H,109,142)(H,110,126)(H,111,127)(H,112,136)(H,113,137)(H,114,135)(H,115,143)(H,116,146)(H,117,147)(H,118,148)(H,119,144)(H,120,145)(H,128,129)(H,130,131)(H,149,150)(H4,92,93,98)(H4,94,95,99)(H4,96,97,100)(H2,151,152,153)/t41-,42-,43-,44-,45-,46-,51-,52-,53-,54-,55-,56-,57-,58-,59-,60-,61-,62-/m0/s1; Key:VDDSMBMSODZKGY-BRMBMGCOSA-N

PTD4-PI3KAc is a polypeptide 21 amino acids in length, which consists of the PTD4 sequence YARAAARQARA or Tyr-Ala-Arg-Ala-Ala-Ala-Arg-Gln-Ala-Arg-Ala, joined to the intracellular phosphorylated domain of the PDGF receptor C terminus with the sequence GSDGGpYMDMS or Gly-Ser-Asp-Gly-Gly-pTyr-Met-Asp-Met-Ser.

The PTD4 domain is a transduction sequence derived by modification of the TAT protein from the HIV virus, which can be used to efficiently transport peptide "cargo" across cell membranes. This has been linked to the phosphopeptide PI3KAc which activates phosphoinositide 3-kinase (PI3K) and its downstream signalling pathway, leading to stimulation of synaptogenesis and spinogenesis in neurons.

Treatment with PTD4-PI3KAc has been shown to increase growth and interconnection of cultured neurons derived from hippocampus tissue in vitro and enhances learning and memory in rats and mice. It has been researched as a potential cognitive enhancer which may lead to novel treatments for neurodegenerative conditions such as Alzheimer's disease.

== See also ==
- Noopept
- Semax
- Selank
