= PEPITEM =

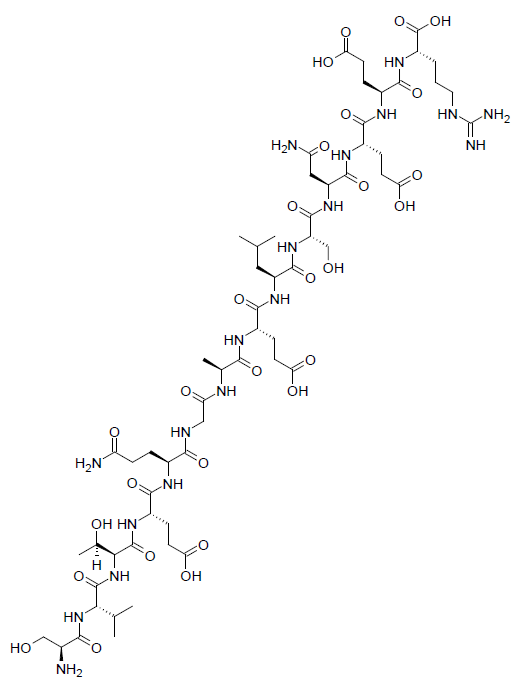

Identifiers
- IUPAC name: L-seryl-L-valyl-L-threonyl-L-α-glutamyl-L-glutaminylglycyl-L-alanyl-L-α-glutamyl-L-leucyl-L-seryl-L-asparaginyl-L-α-glutamyl-L-α-glutamyl-L-Arginine
- CAS Number: 365226-06-8
- PubChem CID: 505189302

Chemical and physical data
- Formula: C_{61}H_{101}N_{19}O_{28}
- Molar mass: 1548.584 g·mol^{−1}
- 3D model (JSmol): Interactive image
- SMILES: O=C(N[C@@H](CCC(=O)N)C(=O)NCC(=O)N[C@@H](C)C(=O)N[C@@H](CCC(=O)O)C(=O)N[C@@H](CC(C)C)C(=O)N[C@@H](CO)C(=O)N[C@@H](CC(=O)N)C(=O)N[C@@H](CCC(=O)O)C(=O)N[C@@H](CCC(O)=O)C(=O)N[C@@H](CCCNC(N)=N)C(=O)O)[C@@H](NC(=O)[C@@H](NC(=O)[C@@H](NC(=O)[C@@H](N)CO)C(C)C)[C@H](O)C)CCC(=O)O
- InChI: InChI=1S/C61H101N19O28/c1-25(2)20-36(55(102)78-38(24-82)57(104)77-37(21-40(64)85)56(103)73-32(11-16-43(89)90)51(98)72-33(12-17-44(91)92)53(100)75-35(60(107)108)8-7-19-67-61(65)66)76-54(101)31(10-15-42(87)88)70-48(95)27(5)69-41(86)22-68-50(97)30(9-14-39(63)84)71-52(99)34(13-18-45(93)94)74-59(106)47(28(6)83)80-58(105)46(26(3)4)79-49(96)29(62)23-81/h25-38,46-47,81-83H,7-24,62H2,1-6H3,(H2,63,84)(H2,64,85)(H,68,97)(H,69,86)(H,70,95)(H,71,99)(H,72,98)(H,73,103)(H,74,106)(H,75,100)(H,76,101)(H,77,104)(H,78,102)(H,79,96)(H,80,105)(H,87,88)(H,89,90)(H,91,92)(H,93,94)(H,107,108)(H4,65,66,67)/t27-,28+,29-,30-,31-,32-,33-,34-,35-,36-,37-,38-,46-,47-/m0/s1; Key:FNMDPJXMBAIAGR-WSBPUMMXSA-N

PEPITEM (Peptide Inhibitor of Trans-Endothelial Migration) is an endogenous polypeptide composed of the 14 amino acids 28–41 of the 14.3.3.ζδ protein, which in turn is a 245 amino-acid product of the YWHAZ gene. It has the sequence SVTEQGAELSNEER. PEPITEM has antiinflammatory effects by inhibiting trafficking of T cells into inflamed tissues. Levels of PEPITEM in the body decline with age, diabetes or rheumatoid arthritis, and decreased PEPITEM levels correlates with increases in chronic inflammation and numerous resulting health issues. Administration of synthetic PEPITEM has been suggested as a treatment for various conditions where inflammation plays a role. Some smaller fragments derived from the sequence of PEPITEM such as SVT-NH-ethyl may also produce similar activity to the full length peptide, but more research and clinical trials are required.

== See also ==
- CyRL-QN15
- Humanin
- TB-500
- Link-N
- PNC-27
