= Leucine rich repeat containing 15 =

Protein-coding gene in the species Homo sapiens

LRRC15

Identifiers
- Aliases: LRRC15, LIB, Leucine rich repeat containing 15
- External IDs: MGI: 1921738; GeneCards: LRRC15

Gene location (Human)
Chr.	Chromosome 3 (human)
Band	3q29	Start	194,355,249 bp
Band	3q29	End	194,369,743 bp

Gene location (Mouse)
Chr.	Chromosome 16 (mouse)
Band	16|16 B2	Start	30,088,120 bp
Band	16|16 B2	End	30,102,074 bp
RNA expression pattern
Bgee	Human / Mouse (ortholog); Top expressed in: periodontal fiber; tendon of biceps brachii; hair follicle; decidua; tibia; skin of hip; skin of thigh; cartilage tissue; skin of arm; mucosa of paranasal sinus / Top expressed in: lip; body of femur; calvaria; skin of abdomen; hair follicle; molar; skin of back; conjunctival fornix; fossa; morula; More reference expression data
BioGPS	n/a
Gene ontology
Molecular function	fibronectin binding; protein kinase inhibitor activity; laminin binding; collagen binding
Cellular component	cytoplasm; integral component of membrane; extracellular exosome; membrane; extracellular space; extracellular matrix; collagen-containing extracellular matrix
Biological process	negative regulation of protein kinase activity; cytokine-mediated signaling pathway; negative regulation of receptor signaling pathway via JAK-STAT; positive regulation of cell migration; negative regulation of protein localization to plasma membrane
Sources:Amigo / QuickGO
Orthologs
Databases	NCBI: entry; OMA: entry
Species	Human	Mouse
Entrez	131578	74488
Ensembl	ENSG00000172061	ENSMUSG00000052316
UniProt	Q8TF66	Q80X72
RefSeq (mRNA)	NM_130830; NM_001135057	NM_028973
RefSeq (protein)	NP_001128529; NP_570843	NP_083249
Location (UCSC)	Chr 3: 194.36 – 194.37 Mb	Chr 16: 30.09 – 30.1 Mb
PubMed search
- Wikidata
View/Edit Human	View/Edit Mouse

Leucine rich repeat containing 15 is a cell membrane-expressed protein. In humans it is encoded by the LRRC15 gene. It is located on chromosome 3 at 3q29. It belongs to the LRR superfamily, which is involved in cell–cell and cell–ECM interactions.

== Tissue distribution ==
LRRC15 displays a highly restricted expression pattern, but is expressed in areas that make up innate immune barriers such as the placenta, skin, activated fibroblasts in wounds, and lymphoid tissues such as the spleen.

== Structure ==
LRRC15 lacks obvious intracellular domains.

== Function ==
LRRC15 may play some role in innate immunity.

== Clinical significance ==
LRRC15 is aberrantly expressed in cancer. It is highly expressed in CAFs within the stroma of numerous solid tumors and directly expressed in mesenchymal tumors such as glioblastoma, sarcomas, and melanoma.

Preliminary evidence indicates that expression may be related to the severity of COVID-19. and that it is an inhibitory accessory factor for SARS-CoV-2 cell entry.

== See also ==
- Leucine-rich repeat
- ACE2
