= Tuftsin =

Names
- IUPAC name L-threonyl-L-lysyl-L-prolyl-L-arginine

Identifiers
CAS Number	9063-57-4
3D model (JSmol)	Interactive image
ChemSpider	21244387
MeSH	Tuftsin
PubChem CID	24780
UNII	QF5336J16C
CompTox Dashboard (EPA)	DTXSID901336069 DTXSID40920839, DTXSID901336069
- InChI: InChI=1S/C21H40N8O6/c1-12(30)16(23)18(32)27-13(6-2-3-9-22)19(33)29-11-5-8-15(29)17(31)28-14(20(34)35)7-4-10-26-21(24)25/h12-16,30H,2-11,22-23H2,1H3,(H,27,32)(H,28,31)(H,34,35)(H4,24,25,26)/t12-,13+,14+,15+,16+/m1/s1 Key: IESDGNYHXIOKRW-YXMSTPNBSA-N
- SMILES: O=C(N[C@@H](CCCNC(N)=N)C(O)=O)[C@@H]1CCCN1C(=O)[C@H](CCCCN)NC(=O)[C@@H](N)[C@@H](C)O

Properties
Chemical formula	C_{21}H_{40}N_{8}O_{6}
Molar mass	500.593 g/mol
- Except where otherwise noted, data are given for materials in their standard state (at 25 °C [77 °F], 100 kPa). verify (what is ?) Infobox references

Tuftsin is a tetrapeptide (Thr-Lys-Pro-Arg, TKPR) located in the Fc-domain of the heavy chain of immunoglobulin G (residues 289-292). It has an immunostimulatory effect. It is named for Tufts University where it was first discovered in 1983.

== Formation ==
Two enzymes are needed to release tuftsin from immunoglobulin G.First, the spleen enzyme tuftsin-endocarboxypeptidase nicks the heavy chain at the Arg-Glu bond (292-293). The arginine carboxy-terminal is now susceptible to the action of the second enzyme, carboxypeptidase β. The leukokinin-S so nicked is present in tissues and blood, free or bound to outer membrane of the appropriate phagocyte. The membrane enzyme leukokininase acts on the bound leukokinin-S to cleave it at the amino end of threonine between residues 288 and 289 (-Lys-Thr-). Free tuftsin is biologically active. The phagocytic cell plays a unique role in releasing its own activator. Leukokininase can be found on the outer membrane of phagocytic cells: blood neutrophil leukocytes of human and dog, rabbit peritoneal granulocyte. It is a highly active enzyme with pH optimum:6.8.

== Function ==
=== Phagocytosis ===
Half-maximum stimulation is attained at about 100 nM. Stimulation of phagocytosis is obtained with polymorphonuclear leukocyte (PMN) cells from human, dog, rabbit and cow as well as with macrophages from the lung and peritoneal cavity of mice, guinea pig and mouse bone marrow cells. This effect is inhibited by peptide analogue Thr-Lys-Pro-Pro-Arg. Basal activity is not inhibited, so basal phagocytosis may follow a different pathway from that which follows stimulation. Stimulation of pinocytosis is exerted only on phagocytic cells, not on cultured cell line mouse leukemia.

=== Motility and chemotaxis ===
The vertical motility of neutrophils in capillary tubes is stimulated by tuftsin, stimulation is inhibited by Thr-Lys-Pro-Pro-Arg. The tuftsin analogue Thr-Pro-Lys-Arg failed to show stimulation.

=== Formation of reactive oxygen compounds ===
Tuftsin augments the formation of O_{2}^{−} and H_{2}O_{2} to a considerable extent without the need for particle phagocytosis. Experiments showed rapid response to various concentrations of tuftsin. The optimum concentration was at 375 nM. This response to tuftsin stimulation of macrophage accounts for about 90% of the superoxide formed through the xanthine oxidase system.

=== Augmentation of Tumor Necrosis Factor ===
Injection of tuftsin intraperitoneally increases the formulation of TNF in serum and supernatants of cultured splenic and peritoneal adherent cells. This was also demonstrated in vitro using HL60 leukemia cells.

=== Immunmodulating activity ===
Tuftsin acts at the level of antigen processing. Antigen uptake by T-lymphocytes is enhanced when a given antigen is processed in the presence of tuftsin. Maximal effect was measured at tuftsin concentration 5 × 10^{−8} M. This process is highly specific and dependent on the structural integrity of tuftsin. Tuftsin-antigen complexes are very immunogenic. The number of antigen-forming cells increases following injections of tuftsin T-dependent antigen. Tuftsin enhances the antigen-dependent cell-mediated immunity. Spleen cell cytotoxicity is augmented to a significant degree.

=== Effect of cell cytotoxicity ===
The enhancement of antitumour immune response by immunomodulators is capable of stimulating reticuloendothelial and T-cell-mediated tumour destruction. The effect of tuftsin on augmentation of cellular cytotoxicity was evaluated both in vitro and in vivo.

=== Nontoxicity for animals and humans ===
In different animal models, tuftsin showed no toxicity when administered intravenously or intraperitoneally. In a phase I study, tuftsin was shown to be nontoxic in adult human patients with advanced cancer when it was injected once intravenously (0.96 mg/kg body weight). Extensive augmentation of white blood counts and enhanced cytotoxicity of lymphocytes was notable. No detectable tuftsin-related toxicity was noticed in human patients during a phase II study, where the peptide was injected intravenously twice a week at total doses of 5 mg per injection.

== Pathology ==
Tuftsin deficiency can be hereditary or can occur following splenectomy, resulting in increased susceptibility to certain diseases e.g.: infected eczematous dermatitis with draining lymph nodes, otitis and sinusitis. Acquired tuftsin deficiency can occur in granulocyte leukemia, when blood neutrophils failed to show stimulation with synthetic tuftsin or with the serum leukokinin. Serum level of tuftsin was minimal or absent.

== Clinical significance ==
Poly- or oligotuftsin derivatives can be used as delivery systems. For example, a 35-40 unit repeat was used as a carrier for the preparation of synthetic immunogens in malaria vaccines against Plasmodium falciparum. Tuftsin enhances the action of rifampicin-bearing liposomes in the treatment of tuberculosis, and that amphotericin B-bearing liposomes in the treatment of human aspergillosis in mice. Conjugates with polytuftsin retain tuftsin-like effects and increase the epitope specific antibody production.

== Tuftsin analogues ==
Tuftsin sequence appears in all four classes of IgG. However, only leukokinin, a small fraction of IgG1, displays tuftsin activity. Tuftsin occurs in guinea pig IgG2 exactly in the same position. The mouse IgG1 analogue is a tetrapeptide Thr-Gln-Pro-Arg (TQPR) at the same place, one base change at the first base of the triplet code. Tuftsin sequence appears in residues 9-12 from the amino terminal of p12 protein of Rauscher murine leukemia virus. The tetrapeptide Thr-Arg-Pro-Lys (TRPK) is in the influenza hemagglutinin virus protein, residues 214–217. The canine analogue is the tetrapeptide Thr-Lys-Pro-Lys (TKPK). The peptide Thr-Arg-Pro-Arg (TRPR) is a biologically active pancreatic polypeptide 32–35 with gastrointestinal functions. Thr-Arg-Pro-Arg, Thr-Lys-Pro-Lys, Thr-Arg-Pro-Lys are as active as Thr-Lys-Pro-Arg. Thr-Lys-Pro-Pro-Arg (TKPPR) is a potent inhibitor. Lys-Pro-Pro-Arg (KPPR) is also an inhibitor of phagocytosis, superoxide anion production and chemotaxis both human and rat PMN leukocytes and monocytes. Tyr-Lys-Pro exert considerable regulatory effect on several macrophage functions including: phagocytosis, cell locomotion, superoxide anion production, IgE-dependent cellular cytotoxicity, β-glycuronidase release, and IL-1 production.

Selank is an elongated version of tuftsin with a Pro-Gly-Pro appended, i.e. Thr-Lys-Pro-Arg-Pro-Gly-Pro (TKPRPGP). It has been claimed to have anti-anxiety and nootropic effects and is used in Russia and other former Soviet bloc countries.
