= PNC-27 =

Clinical data
- Other names: Pro-Pro-Leu-Ser-Gln-Glu-Thr-Phe-Ser-Asp-Leu-Trp-Lys-Leu-Leu-Lys-Lys-Trp-Lys-Met-Arg-Arg-Asn-Gln-Phe-Trp-Val-Lys-Val-Gln-Arg-Gly-OH

Identifiers
- IUPAC name: (4S)-5-[[(2S,3R)-1-[[(2S)-1-[[(2S)-1-[[(2S)-1-[[(2S)-1-[[(2S)-1-[[(2S)-6-amino-1-[[(2S)-1-[[(2S)-1-[[(2S)-6-amino-1-[[(2S)-6-amino-1-[[(2S)-1-[[(2S)-6-amino-1-[[(2S)-1-[[(2S)-1-[[(2S)-1-[[(2S)-4-amino-1-[[(2S)-5-amino-1-[[(2S)-1-[[(2S)-1-[[(2S)-1-[[(2S)-6-amino-1-[[(2S)-1-[[(2S)-5-amino-1-[[(2S)-5-carbamimidamido-1-(carboxymethylamino)-1-oxopentan-2-yl]amino]-1,5-dioxopentan-2-yl]amino]-3-methyl-1-oxobutan-2-yl]amino]-1-oxohexan-2-yl]amino]-3-methyl-1-oxobutan-2-yl]amino]-3-(1H-indol-3-yl)-1-oxopropan-2-yl]amino]-1-oxo-3-phenylpropan-2-yl]amino]-1,5-dioxopentan-2-yl]amino]-1,4-dioxobutan-2-yl]amino]-5-carbamimidamido-1-oxopentan-2-yl]amino]-5-carbamimidamido-1-oxopentan-2-yl]amino]-4-methylsulfanyl-1-oxobutan-2-yl]amino]-1-oxohexan-2-yl]amino]-3-(1H-indol-3-yl)-1-oxopropan-2-yl]amino]-1-oxohexan-2-yl]amino]-1-oxohexan-2-yl]amino]-4-methyl-1-oxopentan-2-yl]amino]-4-methyl-1-oxopentan-2-yl]amino]-1-oxohexan-2-yl]amino]-3-(1H-indol-3-yl)-1-oxopropan-2-yl]amino]-4-methyl-1-oxopentan-2-yl]amino]-3-carboxy-1-oxopropan-2-yl]amino]-3-hydroxy-1-oxopropan-2-yl]amino]-1-oxo-3-phenylpropan-2-yl]amino]-3-hydroxy-1-oxobutan-2-yl]amino]-4-[[(2S)-5-amino-2-[[(2S)-3-hydroxy-2-[[(2S)-4-methyl-2-[[(2S)-1-[(2S)-pyrrolidine-2-carbonyl]pyrrolidine-2-carbonyl]amino]pentanoyl]amino]propanoyl]amino]-5-oxopentanoyl]amino]-5-oxopentanoic acid
- CAS Number: 1159861-00-3
- PubChem CID: 16201774
- ChemSpider: 17330171

Chemical and physical data
- Formula: C_{188}H_{293}N_{53}O_{44}S
- Molar mass: 4031.80 g·mol^{−1}
- 3D model (JSmol): Interactive image
- SMILES: C[C@H]([C@@H](C(=O)N[C@@H](CC1=CC=CC=C1)C(=O)N[C@@H](CO)C(=O)N[C@@H](CC(=O)O)C(=O)N[C@@H](CC(C)C)C(=O)N[C@@H](CC2=CNC3=CC=CC=C32)C(=O)N[C@@H](CCCCN)C(=O)N[C@@H](CC(C)C)C(=O)N[C@@H](CC(C)C)C(=O)N[C@@H](CCCCN)C(=O)N[C@@H](CCCCN)C(=O)N[C@@H](CC4=CNC5=CC=CC=C54)C(=O)N[C@@H](CCCCN)C(=O)N[C@@H](CCSC)C(=O)N[C@@H](CCCNC(=N)N)C(=O)N[C@@H](CCCNC(=N)N)C(=O)N[C@@H](CC(=O)N)C(=O)N[C@@H](CCC(=O)N)C(=O)N[C@@H](CC6=CC=CC=C6)C(=O)N[C@@H](CC7=CNC8=CC=CC=C87)C(=O)N[C@@H](C(C)C)C(=O)N[C@@H](CCCCN)C(=O)N[C@@H](C(C)C)C(=O)N[C@@H](CCC(=O)N)C(=O)N[C@@H](CCCNC(=N)N)C(=O)NCC(=O)O)NC(=O)[C@H](CCC(=O)O)NC(=O)[C@H](CCC(=O)N)NC(=O)[C@H](CO)NC(=O)[C@H](CC(C)C)NC(=O)[C@@H]9CCCN9C(=O)[C@@H]1CCCN1)O
- InChI: InChI=1S/C188H293N53O44S/c1-99(2)82-131(226-169(269)132(83-100(3)4)225-159(259)121(55-30-35-74-192)218-175(275)138(89-109-94-209-115-50-25-22-47-112(109)115)230-170(270)133(84-101(5)6)227-177(277)141(92-150(251)252)233-180(280)143(98-243)237-173(273)136(87-107-44-19-16-20-45-107)235-184(284)154(105(13)244)240-167(267)128(65-69-149(249)250)219-162(262)125(62-66-145(194)245)221-179(279)142(97-242)236-171(271)134(85-102(7)8)234-181(281)144-61-41-80-241(144)185(285)130-60-40-76-204-130)168(268)216-118(52-27-32-71-189)156(256)213-120(54-29-34-73-191)160(260)229-137(88-108-93-208-114-49-24-21-46-111(108)114)174(274)217-119(53-28-33-72-190)157(257)222-129(70-81-286-14)165(265)215-123(58-38-78-206-187(200)201)158(258)214-124(59-39-79-207-188(202)203)161(261)232-140(91-148(197)248)176(276)220-126(63-67-146(195)246)164(264)228-135(86-106-42-17-15-18-43-106)172(272)231-139(90-110-95-210-116-51-26-23-48-113(110)116)178(278)239-153(104(11)12)182(282)223-122(56-31-36-75-193)166(266)238-152(103(9)10)183(283)224-127(64-68-147(196)247)163(263)212-117(57-37-77-205-186(198)199)155(255)211-96-151(253)254/h15-26,42-51,93-95,99-105,117-144,152-154,204,208-210,242-244H,27-41,52-92,96-98,189-193H2,1-14H3,(H2,194,245)(H2,195,246)(H2,196,247)(H2,197,248)(H,211,255)(H,212,263)(H,213,256)(H,214,258)(H,215,265)(H,216,268)(H,217,274)(H,218,275)(H,219,262)(H,220,276)(H,221,279)(H,222,257)(H,223,282)(H,224,283)(H,225,259)(H,226,269)(H,227,277)(H,228,264)(H,229,260)(H,230,270)(H,231,272)(H,232,261)(H,233,280)(H,234,281)(H,235,284)(H,236,271)(H,237,273)(H,238,266)(H,239,278)(H,240,267)(H,249,250)(H,251,252)(H,253,254)(H4,198,199,205)(H4,200,201,206)(H4,202,203,207)/t105-,117+,118+,119+,120+,121+,122+,123+,124+,125+,126+,127+,128+,129+,130+,131+,132+,133+,134+,135+,136+,137+,138+,139+,140+,141+,142+,143+,144+,152+,153+,154+/m1/s1; Key:MZCACYLMMMXSKC-KOCFKOPYSA-N

PNC-27 is a hybrid polypeptide 32 amino acids in length with the amino acid sequence PPLSQETFSDLWKLLKKWKMRRNQFWVKVQRG that is derived from residues 12-26 of the HDM-2 binding domain of the human tumor-suppressing protein p53, linked to a fragment of membrane residency peptide (MRP). It binds to HDM-2 proteins which are preferentially expressed on cancerous cells and show low expression levels on cells from healthy tissues, and causes pore formation in the membranes of a wide variety of types of cancer cells, resulting in lysis and cell death that is selective for cancerous cells over healthy cells. Its use has mainly been restricted to in vitro research in cell lines but serves as a proof of concept for a novel anti-cancer mechanism that may lead to the development of similar peptides for medical use in the treatment of cancer.

== See also ==
- Cathelicidin antimicrobial peptide
- CyRL-QN15
- PEPITEM
- Tertomotide
