= SVT-NH-ethyl =

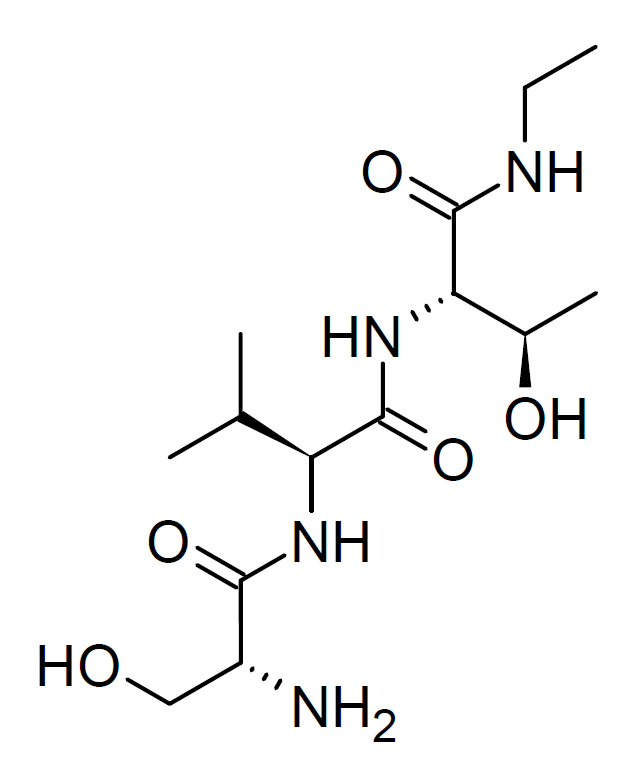

Chemical and physical data
- Formula: C_{14}H_{28}N_{4}O_{5}
- Molar mass: 332.401 g·mol^{−1}
- 3D model (JSmol): Interactive image
- SMILES: C[C@@H](O)[C@H](NC(=O)[C@@H](NC(=O)[C@H](N)CO)C(C)C)C(=O)NCC
- InChI: InChI=InChI=1S/C14H28N4O5/c1-5-16-13(22)11(8(4)20)18-14(23)10(7(2)3)17-12(21)9(15)6-19/h7-11,19-20H,5-6,15H2,1-4H3,(H,16,22)(H,17,21)(H,18,23)/t8-,9-,10+,11+/m1/s1; Key:HXOSJQNMWYDFDT-ZNSHCXBVSA-N

SVT-NH-ethyl (Ser-Val-Thr-NH-ethyl) is an synthetic peptidomimetic compound derived from a tripeptide fragment of the 14 amino acid immunomodulatory peptide PEPITEM. It shows similar antiinflammatory effects to the parent peptide and has potential applications in the treatment of numerous inflammatory disorders.

== See also ==
- Copper peptide GHK-Cu
- GPE
- KPV tripeptide
- Livagen
