= Vladimir Khavinson =

Russian gerontologist (1946–2024)

- Владимир Хавинсон
- Born: 27 November 1946; Cottbus, Germany
- Died: 6 January 2024 (aged 77); Saint Petersburg, Russia
- Scientific career
- Fields: Gerontology
- Workplaces: St. Petersburg Institute of Bioregulation and Gerontology
- Website: khavinson.info

Vladimir Khatskelevich Khavinson (Russian: Владимир Хацкелевич Хавинсон; 27 November 1946 – 6 January 2024) was a Russian gerontologist and professor who was Treasurer of the European region of the International Association of Gerontology and Geriatrics; Main gerontologist of the Health Committee of the Government of Saint Petersburg, Russia; Director of the Saint Petersburg Institute of Bioregulation and Gerontology; Vice-president of Gerontological Society of the Russian Academy of Sciences; Head of the Chair of Gerontology and Geriatrics of the North-Western State Medical University in Saint Petersburg; Colonel of medical service (USSR, Russia).

Vladimir Khavinson is known for the discovery, experimental and clinical studies of new classes of peptide bioregulators as well as for the development of bioregulating peptide therapy. He was engaged in studying of the role of peptides in regulation of the mechanisms of ageing. His main field of actions was design, pre-clinical and clinical studies of new peptide geroprotectors. A 40-year-long investigation resulted in a multitude of methods of application of peptide bioregulators to slow down the process of ageing and increase human life span. Six peptide-based pharmaceuticals and 64 peptide food supplements have been introduced into clinical practice by Khavinson. Patenting endogenous peptides is not a common practice as they are considered a "natural product". He authored 196 patents (Russian and international) as well as of 775 scientific publications.

His major achievements are presented in two books: Peptides and Ageing (NEL, 2002) and Gerontological aspects of genome peptide regulation (Karger AG, 2005).

Vladimir Khavinson introduced scientific specialty "Gerontology and Geriatrics" in the Russian Federation on the governmental level. Academic Council headed by Khavinson oversighted over 200 Ph.D. and Doctorate theses from many countries.

On 26 October 2016, he was awarded the Order of Friendship for his great contribution to the development of healthcare, medical science and many years of conscientious work.

Khavinson died on 6 January 2024, at the age of 77.

== Field of work ==
During 1973–2013, Khavinson et al., extracted from various organs over 20 complexes of physiologically active peptides, as well as 15 others synthesized from amino acids, (di-, tri-, tetrapeptides), all being covered by patents in many countries including the US, Canada, Australia, Europe, Japan, Korea, Israel, etc. After many years of experimental and clinical studies, six medicinal peptide preparations were permitted for medical use in the USSR, Russia, and afterward in the CIS countries. They were primarily to be used by the military medical service. These are ‘Thymalin’- a preparation of the thymus, being a cellular immunity regulator; ‘Epithalamin’ — a preparation from the pineal gland — regulator of the endocrine system, which restores melatonin, (with no analogues worldwide) ‘Cortexin’ — a preparation from the cerebral cortex, brain function regulator; ‘Prostatilen’ or ‘Samprost’ or ‘Vitaprost’ — a preparation from the prostate gland, regulator of prostate function; ‘Retinalamin’ — a preparation from the retina, partially restores functions of the retina in case of laser lesions and degenerative diseases, has no analogues worldwide; ‘Thymogen’ — a dipeptide EW, being first extracted from ‘Thymalin’, then synthesized from amino acids, regulates immunity. These medicinal peptide preparations were first used to restore immune functions of the brain, endocrine system, retina, etc. in military personnel exposed to high radiation, (during accidents at nuclear reactors), or to combat the action of toxic substances (including organophosphate compounds), combat traumas, as well as to prevent acute respiratory infections and flu. They were also used to treat laser retinal lesions in experimental animals exposed to a combat laser. All other peptide preparations, (natural and synthetic) are at different stages of studying in patients with different diseases. Among the important advantages of all designed peptide preparations is that they lack any toxic, allergic or adverse effects, this has been proven both in experimental and clinical studies.

The main objective of studies for the recent decade was fundamental research devoted to the role that small peptides play in the evolution and development of living matter. It was crucial for understanding the mechanism of the action of peptides and evidencing their safety and effectiveness, whilst designing new medicinal preparations, dietary supplements, cosmetics and veterinary preparations.

== List of major publications in English ==
- Vladimir Kh. Khavinson. Peptides and Ageing. // Neuroendocrinology Letters. — Vol. 23, Suppl. 3, Special Issue. — 2002. — 144 p.
- Khavinson, Malinin. Gerontological Aspects of Genome Peptide Regulation. // Basel (Switzerland): Karger AG. — 2005. — 104 p.
- Khavinson. Peptidergic regulation of ageing. // SPb.: Humanistica. — 2009. — 48 p.
- Khavinson, Morozov, Anisimov. Experimental Studies of the Pineal Gland Preparation Epithalamin. // The Pineal Gland and Cancer. — Bartsch C., Bartsch H., Blask D.E., Cardinali D.P., Hrushesky W.J.M., Mecke D. (Eds.) — Springer-Verlag, Berlin, Heidelberg. — 2001. — P. 294–306.
- Vladimir N. Anisimov, Vladimir Kh. Khavinson. Small Peptide-associated Modulation of Aging and Longevity. // Modulating Aging and Longevity. — Kluwer Academic Publishers (Printed in the United Kingdom) — Suresh I.S. Rattan (ed.). — 2003. — P. 279–301.
- Vladimir N. Anisimov, Vladimir Kh. Khavinson. Pineal Peptides as Modulators of Aging. // Aging Interventions and Therapies. — World Scientific. — Suresh I.S. Rattan (ed.). — 2005. — P. 127–146.
- Khavinson, Mikhailova. Health and Aging in Russia. // Global Health and Global Aging. / (ed. by Mary Robinson et al.); foreword by Robert Butler. — 1st ed. — 2007. — P. 226–237.
- Khavinson, Neroev, Trofimova, Osokina. Unique method for restoration of retinal functions in case of different diseases. // SPb. — 2011. — 32 p.

== Individual peptides of note ==
- Bronchogen
- Cartalax
- Cortagen
- Epitalon
- Livagen
- Pinealon
- Vesugen
