= FOXO4 =

Protein

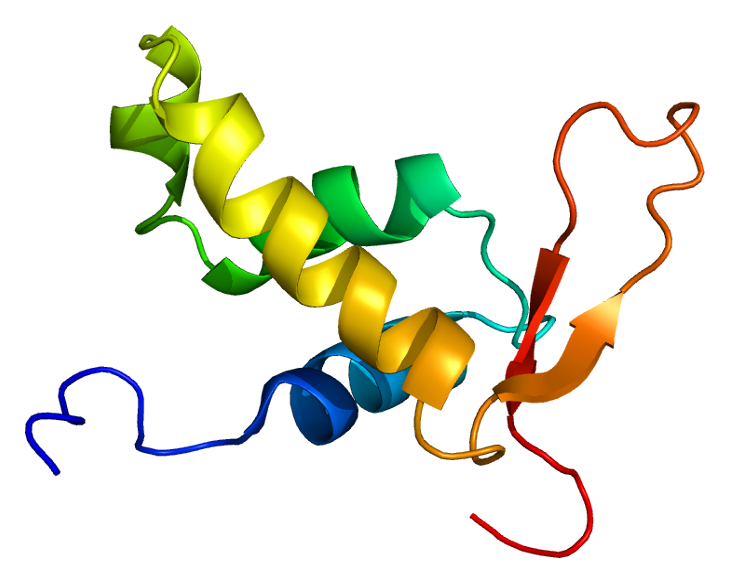

Identifiers
- Aliases: FOXO4, AFX, AFX1, MLLT7, forkhead box O4
- External IDs: OMIM: 300033; MGI: 1891915; GeneCards: FOXO4
Available structures
PDB	Ortholog search: PDBe RCSB
PDB	List of PDB id codes 1E17, 3L2C

Gene location (Human)
Chr.	X chromosome (human)
Band	Xq13.1	Start	71,095,851 bp
Band	Xq13.1	End	71,103,532 bp

Gene location (Mouse)
Chr.	X chromosome (mouse)
Band	X D|X 43.89 cM	Start	100,298,134 bp
Band	X D|X 43.89 cM	End	100,304,479 bp
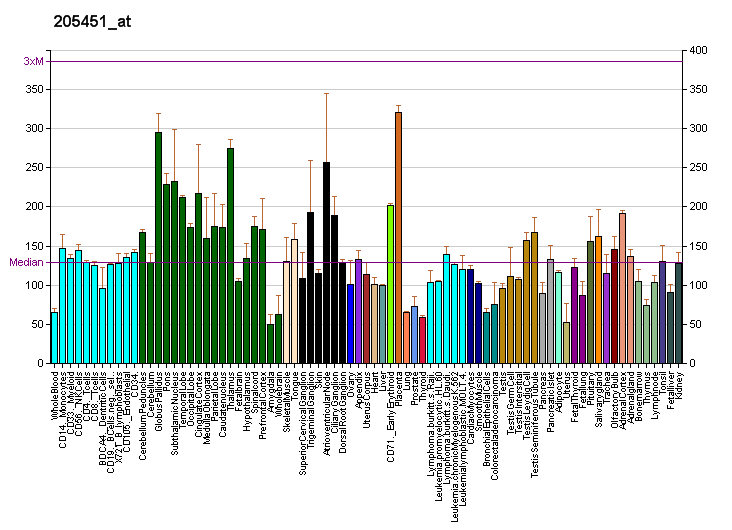
RNA expression pattern
Bgee	Human / Mouse (ortholog); Top expressed in: beta cell; olfactory bulb; gastrocnemius muscle; C1 segment; amygdala; muscle of thigh; internal globus pallidus; putamen; thoracic diaphragm; external globus pallidus / Top expressed in: muscle of thigh; yolk sac; blood; decidua; gastrula; triceps brachii muscle; temporal muscle; sternocleidomastoid muscle; ankle; lip; More reference expression data
BioGPS	More reference expression data
Gene ontology
Molecular function	protein binding; enzyme binding; transcription factor binding; beta-catenin binding; identical protein binding; DNA binding; DNA-binding transcription factor activity; promoter-specific chromatin binding; DNA-binding transcription activator activity, RNA polymerase II-specific; sequence-specific DNA binding; DNA-binding transcription factor activity, RNA polymerase II-specific
Cellular component	cytoplasm; cytosol; nucleus; nucleoplasm; nuclear speck
Biological process	positive regulation of transcription, DNA-templated; negative regulation of smooth muscle cell differentiation; negative regulation of G0 to G1 transition; insulin receptor signaling pathway; negative regulation of angiogenesis; multicellular organism development; cell differentiation; transcription, DNA-templated; muscle organ development; stem cell differentiation; transcription by RNA polymerase II; positive regulation of transcription by RNA polymerase II; mitotic G2 DNA damage checkpoint signaling; cell cycle; regulation of transcription, DNA-templated; negative regulation of cell population proliferation; response to water-immersion restraint stress; response to nutrient levels; ageing; positive regulation of smooth muscle cell migration; protein deubiquitination; negative regulation of transcription by RNA polymerase II; glucose homeostasis
Sources:Amigo / QuickGO
Orthologs
Databases	NCBI: entry; OMA: entry
Species	Human	Mouse
Entrez	4303	54601
Ensembl	ENSG00000184481	ENSMUSG00000042903
UniProt	P98177	Q9WVH3
RefSeq (mRNA)	NM_001170931; NM_005938	NM_018789
RefSeq (protein)	NP_001164402; NP_005929	NP_061259
Location (UCSC)	Chr X: 71.1 – 71.1 Mb	Chr X: 100.3 – 100.3 Mb
PubMed search
- Wikidata
View/Edit Human	View/Edit Mouse

Forkhead box protein O4 is a protein that in humans is encoded by the FOXO4 gene.

== Structure and function ==
FOXO4 is a member of the forkhead family of transcription factors in O subclass, which is characterized by a winged helix domain used for DNA binding. There are 4 members of the FOXO family, including FOXO1, FOXO3, and FOXO6. Their activity is modified by many post translational activities, such as phosphorylation, ubiquitination, and acetylation. Depending on this modified state, FOXO4 binding affinity for DNA is altered, allowing for FOXO4 to regulate many cellular pathways including oxidative stress signaling, longevity, insulin signaling, cell cycle progression, and apoptosis. Two of the main upstream regulators of FOXO4 activity are phosphoinositide 3- kinase (PI3K) and serine/threonine kinase AKT/PKB. Both PI3K and AKT modify FOXO4 and prevent it from translocating to the nucleus, effectively preventing the transcription of the downstream FOXO targets.

== Clinical significance ==
=== Associations with longevity ===
FOXO transcription factors have been shown to be the downstream effector molecules of insulin-like growth factor (IGF) signaling pathway. In the absence of insulin, PI3K is inactive, so the FOXO homolog daf-16 is able to translocate to the nucleus and turn on many genetic pathways associated with longevity in the roundworm Caenorhabditis elegans. FOXO's activation of these pathways produces an increase in lifespan for worms, flies, mice; similar variants of FOXO3a have been associated with longer human lives as well.

FOXO4 can bind with p53 protein to induce cellular senescence. A peptide competing with FOXO4 can act as a senolytic by excluding p53 from the nucleus.

=== Cancer ===
Many different kinds of cancers have been observed to contain mutations that promote AKT phosphorylation, and thus the inactivation of FOXOs, effectively preventing proper cell cycle regulation. FOXO4 activates the cell cycle dependent kinase inhibitor, P27, which in turn prevents tumors from progressing into G1. In HER-2 positive tumor cells, increasing FOXO4 activity reduces tumor size. Chromosomal translocations of FOXO4 have been shown to be a cause of acute leukemia. The fusion proteins formed by these translocations lack the DNA-binding domain, causing the protein to lose function.

In gastric cancers (GC), it has been observed that there were lower levels of FOXO4 mRNA in cancers that had already progressed to invading lymph nodes compared to cancers that remained in situ. When compared to normal tissue, all GC epithelia had lower levels of FOXO4 located in the nucleus, consistent with less FOXO4 effector activity and FOXO4's function as a suppressor of carcinogenic properties. It does this by causing cell cycle arrest between the Go and S phases, preventing cell proliferation, as well as by inhibiting metastasis by downregulating vimentin. These results are consistent with FOXO4 providing a role in inhibiting the epithelia to mesenchymal transition (EMT).

In non-small cell lung carcinoma, there are varying levels of FOXO4 expressed that correspond to how the cancer was staged; worse cases had the lowest amount of FOXO4 while less severe cases had higher levels of FOXO4. As with gastric cancer, these cancers with the lowest levels of FOXO4 also had the lowest levels of E-cadherin and highest levels of vimentin, consistent with FOXO4 acting as a suppressor of the EMT phenotype.

== Interactions ==
- PIN1, Mdm2 – FOXO4 has been shown to interact with PIN1 and Mdm2.
- CIC – chromosomal translocation resulting in a fusion CIC-FOXO4 protein is observed in some tumors.

== See also ==
- FOX proteins
- FOXO4-DRI
