= KPV tripeptide =

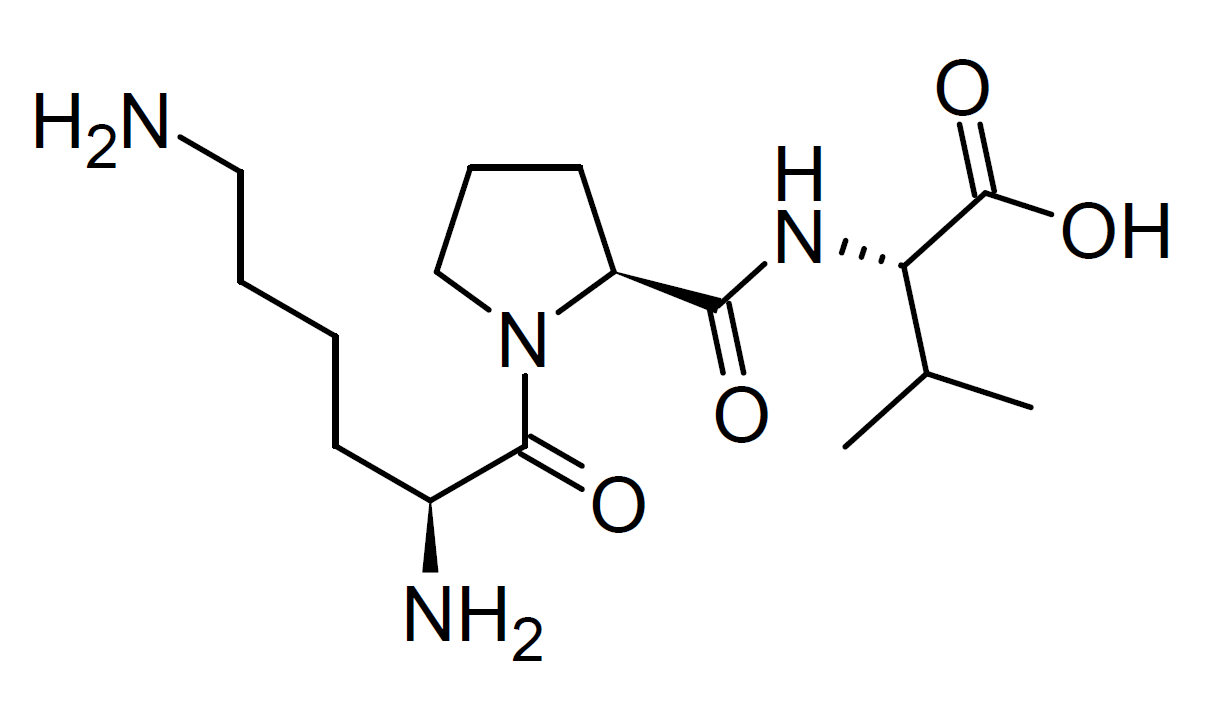

Identifiers
- IUPAC name: (2S)-2-[[(2S)-1-[(2S)-2,6-diaminohexanoyl]pyrrolidine-2-carbonyl]amino]-3-methylbutanoic acid
- CAS Number: 67727-97-3
- PubChem CID: 125672
- ChemSpider: 111779
- ChEBI: CHEBI:160254
- CompTox Dashboard (EPA): DTXSID80987067

Chemical and physical data
- Formula: C_{16}H_{30}N_{4}O_{4}
- Molar mass: 342.440 g·mol^{−1}
- 3D model (JSmol): Interactive image
- SMILES: CC(C)[C@@H](C(=O)O)NC(=O)[C@@H]1CCCN1C(=O)[C@H](CCCCN)N
- InChI: InChI=1S/C16H30N4O4/c1-10(2)13(16(23)24)19-14(21)12-7-5-9-20(12)15(22)11(18)6-3-4-8-17/h10-13H,3-9,17-18H2,1-2H3,(H,19,21)(H,23,24)/t11-,12-,13-/m0/s1; Key:YSPZCHGIWAQVKQ-AVGNSLFASA-N

KPV tripeptide (Lys-Pro-Val) is a tripeptide derivative that is derived from the C-terminal fragment of alpha-MSH. It has antiinflammatory effects, and is used in skincare products, as well as having been researched for other potential medical applications.

== See also ==
- Cartalax
- Cortagen
- CyRL-QN15
- Epitalon
- GHK-Cu
- GPE
- Glycyl-prolyl-hydroxyproline
- Livagen
- Pinealon
- SVT-NH-ethyl
- Tetrapeptide-21
