= Cortagen =

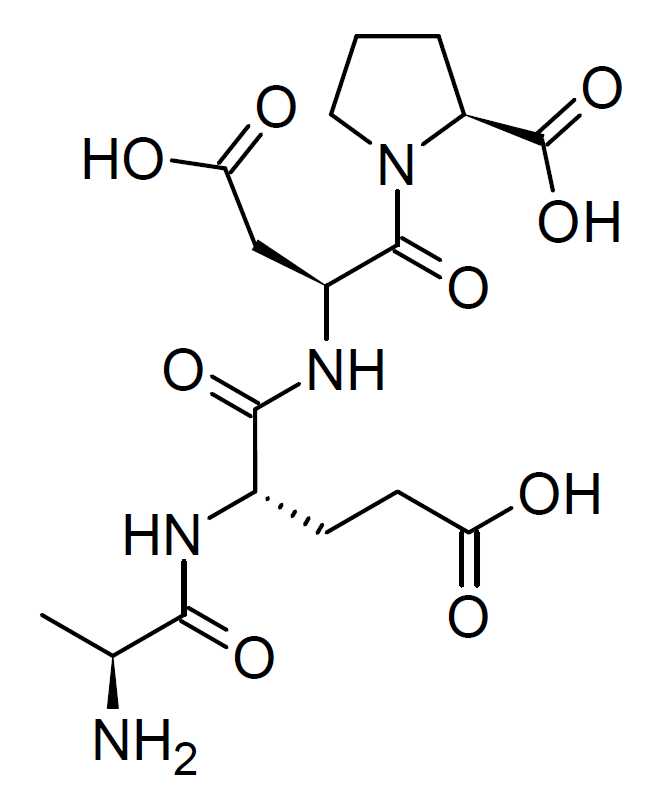

Identifiers
- IUPAC name: (2S)-1-[(2S)-2-[[(2S)-2-[[(2S)-2-aminopropanoyl]amino]-4-carboxybutanoyl]amino]-3-carboxypropanoyl]pyrrolidine-2-carboxylic acid
- PubChem CID: 18439621
- ChemSpider: 16364972

Chemical and physical data
- Formula: C_{17}H_{26}N_{4}O_{9}
- Molar mass: 430.414 g·mol^{−1}
- 3D model (JSmol): Interactive image
- SMILES: C[C@@H](C(=O)N[C@@H](CCC(=O)O)C(=O)N[C@@H](CC(=O)O)C(=O)N1CCC[C@H]1C(=O)O)N
- InChI: InChI=1S/C17H26N4O9/c1-8(18)14(26)19-9(4-5-12(22)23)15(27)20-10(7-13(24)25)16(28)21-6-2-3-11(21)17(29)30/h8-11H,2-7,18H2,1H3,(H,19,26)(H,20,27)(H,22,23)(H,24,25)(H,29,30)/t8-,9-,10-,11-/m0/s1; Key:PLTRIMAUDDQYRV-NAKRPEOUSA-N

Cortagen is a tetrapeptide with the sequence AEDP or Ala-Glu-Asp-Pro. It was originally identified as a primary active component of Cortexin, a mixture of peptides derived from cow brain cortex tissue. It is claimed to stimulate nerve growth and enhance repair of damaged nerves.

== See also ==
- Bronchogen
- Cibinetide
- Epitalon
- FGL-S
- GHK-Cu
- GPE
- KPV tripeptide
- Livagen
- Pinealon
- Vladimir Khavinson
