= Angiotensin-converting enzyme 2 =

Exopeptidase enzyme that acts on angiotensin I and II

ACE2
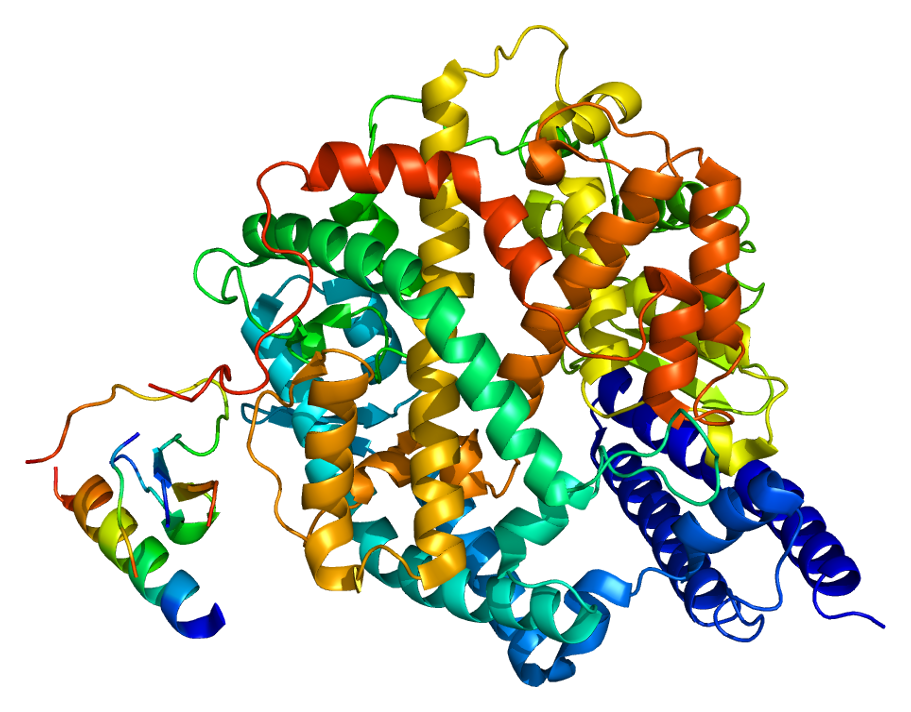

Identifiers
- Aliases: ACE2, ACEH, angiotensin I converting enzyme 2, ACE 2
- External IDs: OMIM: 300335; MGI: 1917258; GeneCards: ACE2
Available structures
PDB	Ortholog search: PDBe RCSB
PDB	List of PDB id codes 3SCL, 1R42, 1R4L, 2AJF, 3D0G, 3D0H, 3D0I, 3KBH, 3SCI, 3SCJ, 3SCK
Enzyme activity
EC #	BRENDA	ExPASy	KEGG	MetaCyc
3.4.17.23	↗	↗	↗	↗

Gene location (Human)
Chr.	X chromosome (human)
Band	Xp22.2	Start	15,561,033 bp
Band	Xp22.2	End	15,602,148 bp

Gene location (Mouse)
Chr.	X chromosome (mouse)
Band	X F5|X 76.12 cM	Start	162,922,328 bp
Band	X F5|X 76.12 cM	End	162,971,416 bp
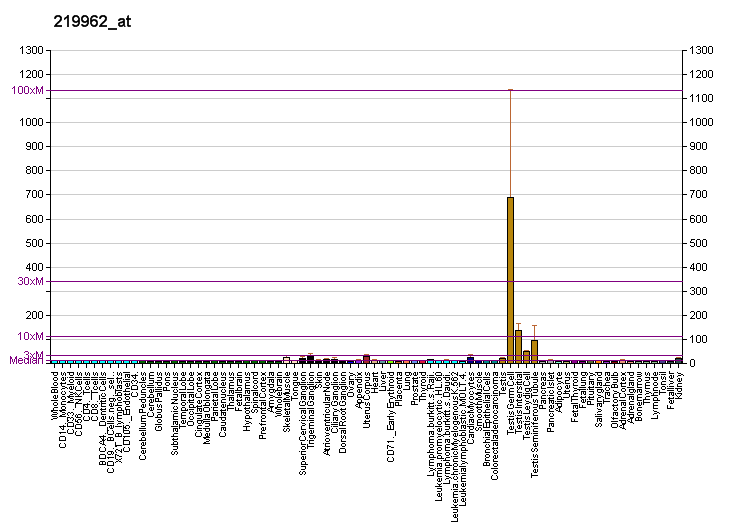

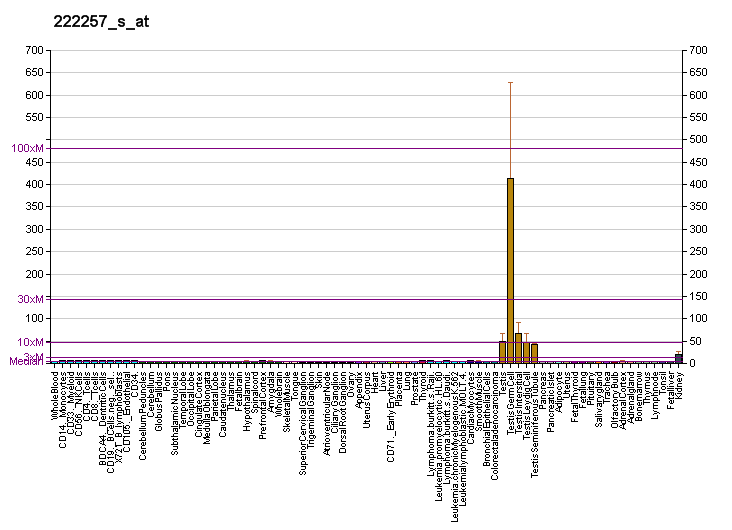
RNA expression pattern
Bgee	Human / Mouse (ortholog); Top expressed in: mucosa of ileum; gallbladder; jejunal mucosa; duodenum; right testis; left testis; left ventricle; human kidney; mucosa of transverse colon; apex of heart / Top expressed in: ileum; duodenum; jejunum; epithelium of small intestine; intestinal villus; stroma of kidney; Ileal epithelium; migratory enteric neural crest cell; Paneth cell; esophagus; More reference expression data
BioGPS	More reference expression data
Gene ontology
Molecular function	peptidyl-dipeptidase activity; virus receptor activity; zinc ion binding; endopeptidase activity; metal ion binding; peptidase activity; protein binding; carboxypeptidase activity; hydrolase activity; metallopeptidase activity; metallocarboxypeptidase activity; exopeptidase activity
Cellular component	cytoplasm; integral component of membrane; membrane; plasma membrane; extracellular region; cell surface; membrane raft; extracellular exosome; extracellular space; brush border membrane
Biological process	regulation of cardiac conduction; angiotensin-mediated drinking behavior; proteolysis; regulation of cytokine production; positive regulation of reactive oxygen species metabolic process; regulation of vasoconstriction; regulation of cell population proliferation; positive regulation of cardiac muscle contraction; regulation of inflammatory response; positive regulation of gap junction assembly; viral entry into host cell; viral process; regulation of systemic arterial blood pressure by renin-angiotensin; tryptophan transport; blood vessel diameter maintenance; angiotensin maturation; receptor-mediated virion attachment to host cell; positive regulation of amino acid transport
Sources:Amigo / QuickGO
Orthologs
Databases	NCBI: entry; OMA: entry
Species	Human	Mouse
Entrez	59272	70008
Ensembl	ENSG00000130234	ENSMUSG00000015405
UniProt	Q9BYF1	Q8R0I0
RefSeq (mRNA)	NM_021804; NM_001371415	NM_001130513; NM_027286
RefSeq (protein)	NP_068576; NP_001358344	NP_001123985; NP_081562
Location (UCSC)	Chr X: 15.56 – 15.6 Mb	Chr X: 162.92 – 162.97 Mb
PubMed search
- Wikidata
View/Edit Human	View/Edit Mouse

Angiotensin-converting enzyme 2 (ACE2) is an enzyme that can be found either attached to the membrane of cells (mACE2) in the intestines, kidney, testis, gallbladder, and heart or in a soluble form (sACE2). Both membrane bound and soluble ACE2 are integral parts of the renin–angiotensin–aldosterone system (RAAS) that exists to keep the body's blood pressure in check. mACE2 is cleaved by the enzyme ADAM17 in a process regulated by substrate presentation. ADAM17 cleavage releases the extracellular domain creating soluble ACE2 (sACE2). ACE2 enzyme activity opposes the classical arm of the RAAS by lowering blood pressure through catalyzing the hydrolysis of angiotensin II (a vasoconstrictor peptide which raises blood pressure) into angiotensin (1–7) (a vasodilator). Angiotensin (1-7) in turns binds to MasR receptors creating localized vasodilation and hence decreasing blood pressure. This decrease in blood pressure makes the entire process a promising drug target for treating cardiovascular diseases.

mACE2 (Membrane-bound angiotensin-converting enzyme 2) also serves as the entry point into cells for some coronaviruses, including HCoV-NL63, SARS-CoV, and SARS-CoV-2. While mACE2's function is not that of a biological receptor, because of its receptor-like interaction with viruses it is also referred to as the ACE2 receptor. The human version of the enzyme can be referred to as hACE2.

== Tissue distribution ==
mACE2 is attached to the cell membrane of mainly enterocytes of the small intestine and duodenum, proximal tubular cells of the kidneys, glandular cells of the gallbladder, as well as Sertoli cells and Leydig cells of the testis. The expression profile of mACE2 in the human body was recently thoroughly evaluated by the Human Protein Atlas team using a large-scale multiomics approach combining several different methods for analysis of gene expression, including a stringent immunohistochemical analysis using two independent antibodies. In addition to the above-mentioned issues, mACE2 expression was also seen in endothelial cells and pericytes of blood vessels within certain tissues, cardiomyocytes in heart tissue, and a smaller subset of cells within the thyroid gland, epididymis, seminal vesicle, pancreas, liver and placenta. Despite the fact that the respiratory system is the primary route of SARS-CoV-2 infection, very limited expression is seen, both at protein and mRNA level. The expression within the respiratory system is mainly restricted to the upper bronchial and nasal epithelia, especially in the ciliated cells.

== Structure ==
Angiotensin-converting enzyme 2

Identifiers
- EC no.: 3.4.17.23

Databases
- BRENDA: enzyme data
- ExPASy: NiceZyme view
- KEGG: enzyme entry
- MetaCyc: metabolic pathway
- Rhea: reactions
- PDB structures: RCSB PDB PDBe PDBsum
Search
- PMC: articles
- PubMed: articles
- NCBI: proteins

Membrane bound angiotensin-converting enzyme 2 (mACE2) is a zinc-containing metalloenzyme located on the surface of intestinal enterocytes, renal tubular cells and other cells. mACE2 protein contains an N-terminal peptidase M2 domain and a C-terminal collectrin renal amino acid transporter domain.

mACE2 is a single-pass type I membrane protein, with its enzymatically active domain exposed on the surface of cells in the intestines and other tissues. The extracellular domain of mACE2 can be cleaved from the transmembrane domain by another enzyme known as ADAM17 a member of the sheddase enzyme family, during the protective phase of RAAS, the Renin–Angiotensin–Aldosterone System, which regulates our body's blood pressure. The resulting cleaved protein is known as soluble ACE2 or sACE2. It is released into the bloodstream where one of sACE2's functions is to turn excess angiotensin II into angiotensin 1-7 which binds to MasR receptors creating localized vasodilation and hence decreasing blood pressure. Excess sACE2 may ultimately be excreted in the urine.

== Function ==
As part of the renin–angiotensin–aldosterone system (RAAS) protective phase, soluble ACE2's (sACE2) important function is to act as a counterbalance to the angiotensin-converting enzyme (ACE). ACE cleaves angiotensin I hormone into the vasoconstricting angiotensin II which causes a cascade of hormonal reactions which is part of the body's harmful phase of RAAS, which ultimately leads to an increase in the body's blood pressure. ACE2 has an opposing effect to ACE, degrading angiotensin II into angiotensin (1-7), thereby lowering blood pressure.

sACE2, as part of RAAS's protective phase, cleaves the carboxyl-terminal amino acid phenylalanine from angiotensin II (Asp-Arg-Val-Tyr-Ile-His-Pro-Phe) and hydrolyses it into the vasodilator angiotensin (1-7) (H-Asp-Arg-Val-Tyr-Ile-His-Pro-OH), which binds to Mas Receptors and ultimately leads to a decrease in blood pressure. sACE2 can also cleave numerous peptides, including [des-Arg9]-bradykinin, apelin, neurotensin, dynorphin A, and ghrelin.

mACE2 also regulates the membrane trafficking of the neutral amino acid transporter SLC6A19 and has been implicated in Hartnup's disease.

Research in mice has shown that ACE2 (whether it is the membrane bound version or soluble is inconclusive) is involved in regulation of the blood glucose level but its mechanism is yet to be confirmed.

== Clinical significance ==
=== Coronavirus entry point ===
As a transmembrane protein, mACE2 is the main entry receptor for several coronaviruses, including HCoV-NL63, SARS-CoV (the cause of SARS), and SARS-CoV-2 (the cause of COVID-19). The binding of the S1 site of the viral spike protein to the enzymatic domain of mACE2 on host cells initiates endocytosis and translocation of both virus and enzyme into endosomes. Blocking endocytosis in culture traps virus particles on the cell surface. The spike protein itself can also damage the endothelium through downregulation of ACE2. The receptor-binding domain (RBD) of the spike protein specifically attaches to ACE2, enabling viral entry and replication, while surfactant proteins SP-A and SP-D may reduce the strength of this interaction.

Binding of SARS-CoV and SARS-CoV-2 through mACE2 in cardiac tissue has been linked to myocarditis which is inflammation of the heart muscle. During the SARS outbreak, viral RNA was detected in heart specimens from 35% of fatal cases, and diseased hearts express higher levels of mACE2 than healthy hearts. Entry also requires priming of the spike protein by host serine protease TMPRSS2, a potential therapeutic target, and disruption of spike glycosylation strongly impairs viral entry. In mice, spike binding reduces mACE2 through internalization and degradation, contributing to lung injury. By contrast, sACE2 protects against lung injury by promoting formation of angiotensin 1–7, a vasodilator, and may also neutralize coronavirus spikes by binding them. Even low mACE2 levels can allow entry if TMPRSS2 is present.

Rodent studies have shown that ACE inhibitors and angiotensin II receptor blockers (ARBs) upregulate mACE2, raising concern they might worsen infections. However, a 2012 systematic review and meta-analysis found ACE inhibitors reduced pneumonia risk by 34% and lowered pneumonia-related mortality. A 2020 study in Hubei Province reported lower mortality in hypertensive COVID-19 patients taking ACE inhibitors or ARBs (3.7%) compared to those not taking them (9.8%). Despite debate over discontinuation, professional societies recommend continuing ACE inhibitors and ARBs in COVID-19 patients. High plasma ACE2 levels predict worse COVID-19 outcomes, and are elevated in patients with hypertension and heart disease.

Because ACE2 is the entry receptor for SARS-CoV-2, genetic variation may influence susceptibility to infection. Several studies report that ACE2 missense variants alter spike-binding affinity and susceptibility to pseudovirus entry. Rare variants may even confer complete resistance. Expression levels of ACE2 at the cell surface also influence susceptibility and tissue tropism, since SARS-CoV-2 distribution depends on ACE2 expression across tissues. A variant on the X chromosome (rs190509934:C) lowers ACE2 expression by 37% and has been associated with protection against severe COVID-19 outcomes.

=== Recombinant ACE2 ===
Recombinant human ACE2 (rhACE2) is being developed as an enzymatically active, soluble "decoy" that both binds the SARS-CoV-2 spike protein to block cell entry and converts angiotensin II to angiotensin-(1–7), thereby rebalancing the renin–angiotensin system. This dual mechanism underpins its proposed use in viral pneumonias and lung or vascular injury. In humans, rhACE2 has a half-life of ~10 hours, an onset of action of about 30 minutes, and a duration of ~24 hours, and may be useful for patients intolerant to classic RAS inhibitors or in conditions with elevated circulating angiotensin II.

Preclinical studies have demonstrated protective effects in lung injury. In a piglet model of lipopolysaccharide-induced acute respiratory distress syndrome (ARDS), rhACE2 improved pulmonary blood flow and oxygenation. Clinical-grade human recombinant soluble ACE2 (hrsACE2) also reduced SARS-CoV-2 recovery from vero cells by 1,000–5,000-fold in vitro, whereas the mouse ortholog had no such effect, consistent with a decoy mechanism. Engineered ACE2 mutants with enhanced affinity for the viral Spike protein neutralised SARS-CoV-2 in vitro, and a triple-mutant (sACE2.v2.4) with nanomolar Spike binding blocked pseudovirus entry in lung cell lines and prevented SARS-CoV-2–induced ARDS in ACE2-humanized mice. Novel formats such as Fc-fusions, multimers, and affinity-enhanced constructs are being designed to prolong half-life and broaden neutralization against immune-evasive variants, positioning ACE2 decoys as a potentially variant-agnostic antiviral strategy.

Clinically, intravenous rhACE2 (also termed APN01/GSK2586881) has been tested in ARDS, pulmonary arterial hypertension (PAH), and severe COVID-19, including studies of nebulized or inhaled formulations for direct airway exposure. Early trials showed acceptable safety and pharmacodynamic changes (decreased Ang II, increased Ang-(1–7)), and the agent progressed to phase II testing in COVID-19. Nonetheless, reviews emphasize that clinical efficacy remains unproven, and further randomized studies are needed to clarify optimal dosing, delivery routes, and whether catalytic activity should be preserved versus "decoy-only" constructs. Overall, rhACE2 and next-generation ACE2 decoys remain promising host-targeted therapeutics, particularly as monoclonal antibody antivirals lose potency against new SARS-CoV-2 variants.

== See also ==
- Renin–angiotensin system
- SARS-CoV-2 § Virology
- LRRC15
