= Glypromate =

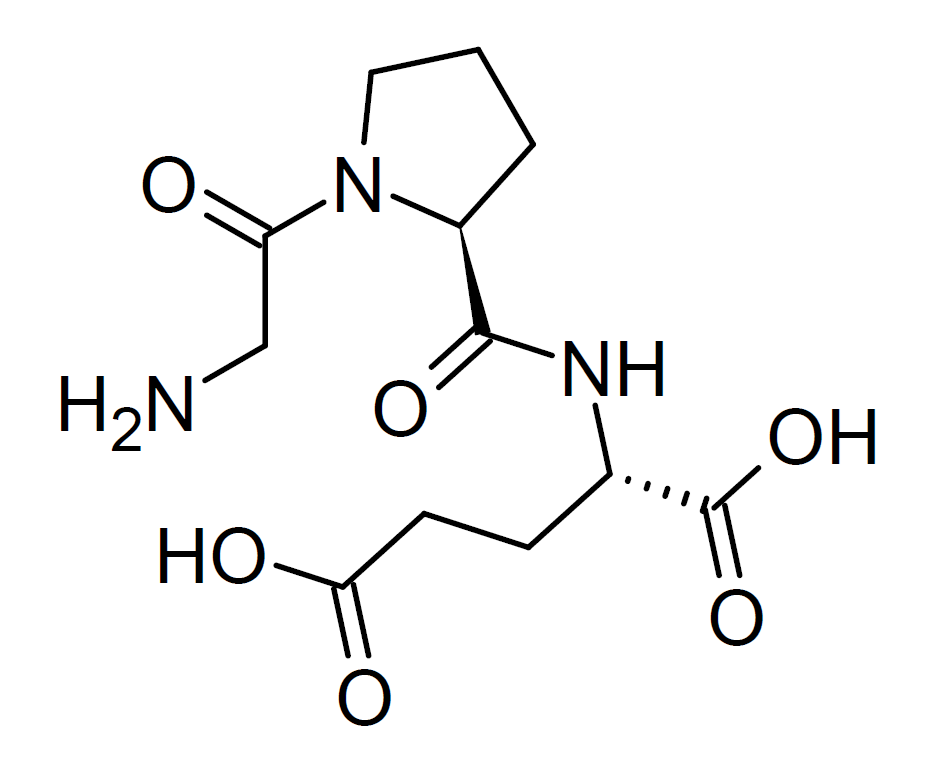

Identifiers
- IUPAC name: (2S)-2-[[(2S)-1-(2-aminoacetyl)pyrrolidine-2-carbonyl]amino]pentanedioic acid
- CAS Number: 32302-76-4
- PubChem CID: 3080768
- DrugBank: DB05633
- ChemSpider: 2338502
- UNII: ZYK4RVV5LS
- ChEBI: CHEBI:163960
- ChEMBL: ChEMBL371315
- CompTox Dashboard (EPA): DTXSID80186038

Chemical and physical data
- Formula: C_{12}H_{19}N_{3}O_{6}
- Molar mass: 301.299 g·mol^{−1}
- 3D model (JSmol): Interactive image
- SMILES: C1C[C@H](N(C1)C(=O)CN)C(=O)N[C@@H](CCC(=O)O)C(=O)O
- InChI: InChI=1S/C12H19N3O6/c13-6-9(16)15-5-1-2-8(15)11(19)14-7(12(20)21)3-4-10(17)18/h7-8H,1-6,13H2,(H,14,19)(H,17,18)(H,20,21)/t7-,8-/m0/s1; Key:JJGBXTYGTKWGAT-YUMQZZPRSA-N

Glypromate (Gly-Pro-Glu, GPE) is a tripeptide fragment derived from the N-terminus of the endogenous growth factor IGF-1. It has antiinflammatory and neuroprotective effects and is of interest in the treatment of neurological conditions such as Alzheimer's disease and Parkinson's disease. The simple GPE peptide has poor blood-brain barrier penetration and is rapidly metabolised in the body, however a number of synthetic derivatives of GPE have been developed with improved properties.

== See also ==
- Cortagen
- Copper peptide GHK-Cu
- KPV tripeptide
- Livagen
- N-Acetylcysteine ethyl ester
- SVT-NH-ethyl
