= Pinealon =

Purported geroprotective agent

Clinical data
- Other names: Glu-Asp-Arg

Identifiers
- IUPAC name: (4S)-4-Amino-5-[[(2S)-3-carboxy-1-[[(1S)-1-carboxy-4-(diaminomethylideneamino)butyl]amino]-1-oxopropan-2-yl]amino]-5-oxopentanoic acid
- CAS Number: 175175-23-2
- PubChem CID: 10273502
- ChemSpider: 8448980
- ChEBI: CHEBI:156374

Chemical and physical data
- Formula: C_{15}H_{26}N_{6}O_{8}
- Molar mass: 418.407 g·mol^{−1}
- 3D model (JSmol): Interactive image
- SMILES: C(C[C@@H](C(=O)O)NC(=O)[C@H](CC(=O)O)NC(=O)[C@H](CCC(=O)O)N)CN=C(N)N
- InChI: InChI=1S/C15H26N6O8/c16-7(3-4-10(22)23)12(26)21-9(6-11(24)25)13(27)20-8(14(28)29)2-1-5-19-15(17)18/h7-9H,1-6,16H2,(H,20,27)(H,21,26)(H,22,23)(H,24,25)(H,28,29)(H4,17,18,19)/t7-,8-,9-/m0/s1; Key:QPRZKNOOOBWXSU-CIUDSAMLSA-N

Pinealon, also known as EDR peptide, is a synthetic tripeptide of sequence (Glu-Asp-Arg) and purported geroprotector documented in the Russian scientific literature. Pinealon is one of several tripeptide "bioregulators" developed in Russia.

== Research ==
Pinealon has been shown to protect rat offspring from prenatal hyperhomocysteinemia and correspondingly improve post natal cognitive function.

Pinealon likewise maintains learning retention rats with experimentally-induced diabetes.

== Chemistry ==
Pinealon is a tripeptide composed of L-glutamic acid, L-aspartic acid, and L-arginine and is notated as Glu-Asp-Arg or EDR.

== See also ==
- Adamax
- Cartalax
- Epitalon
- GHK-Cu
- KPV tripeptide
- Selank
- Semax
- Vladimir Khavinson
