= Angiotensin (1-7) =

Chemical compound

Identifiers
- Symbol: Angiotensin (1-7)
- SCOP2: 2PJ8 / SCOPe / SUPFAM

Angiotensin (1-7) (C_{41}H_{62}N_{12}O_{11}; Molecular weight = 899.02 g/mol; H-Asp-Arg-Val-Tyr-Ile-His-Pro-OH) is an active heptapeptide of the renin–angiotensin system (RAS). It also known by the generic name talfirastide (development name TXA127).

In 1988, Santos et al demonstrated that angiotensin (1-7) was a main product of the incubation of angiotensin I with brain micropunch biopsies and Schiavone et al reported the first biological effect of this heptapeptide.

Benter et al were the first to report that Ang-(1-7) behaves in a way opposite to that of Ang II and that intavenous administration of Ang-(1-7) produces blood pressure lowering effects by activating its own receptor Angiotensin (1-7) is a vasodilator agent affecting cardiovascular organs, such as heart, blood vessels and kidneys, with functions frequently opposed to those attributed to the major effector component of the RAS, angiotensin II (Ang II).

== Synthesis ==
The polypeptide Ang I can be converted into Ang (1-7) by the actions of neprilysin (NEP) and thimet oligopeptidase (TOP) enzymes. Also, Ang II can be hydrolyzed into Ang (1-7) through the actions of angiotensin-converting enzyme 2 (ACE2). Ang (1-7) binds and activates the G-protein coupled receptor Mas receptor leading to opposite effects of those of Ang II.

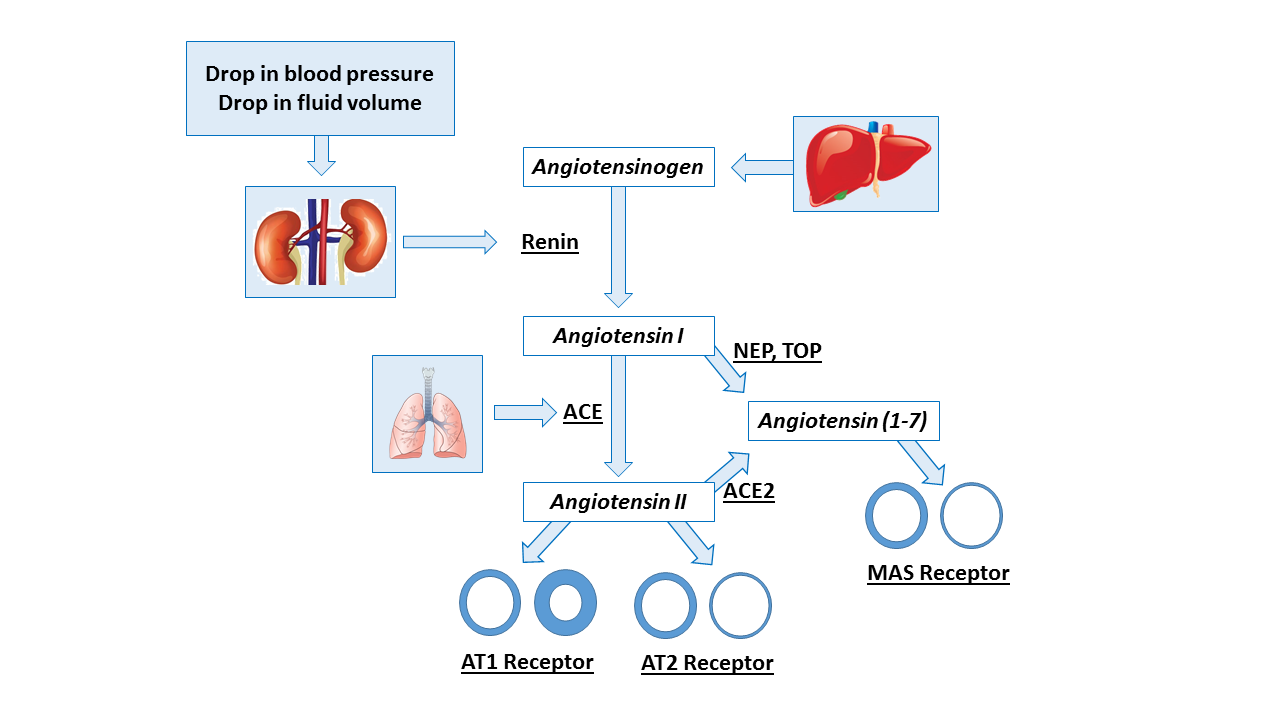
Angiotensin (1-7) synthesis pathway

=== Possible pathways ===
- Action of neprilysin on angiotensin I or angiotensin II.
- Action of prolyl endopeptidase on angiotensin I.
- Action of ACE on angiotensin 1-9.
- Action of neprilysin on angiotensin 1-9.
- Action of ACE2 on angiotensin II.

== Effects ==
Ang (1-7) has been shown to have anti-oxidant and anti-inflammatory effects. It helps protect cardiomyocytes of spontaneously hypertensive rats by increasing the expression of endothelial and neuronal nitric oxide synthase enzymes, augmenting production of nitric oxide.

== Pharmacological interactions ==
Ang (1-7) contributes to the beneficial effects of ACE inhibitors and angiotensin II receptor type 1 antagonists.

== Clinical trials ==
Talfirastide has been tested in people with COVID-19 and stroke.
