= Selank =

Chemical compound

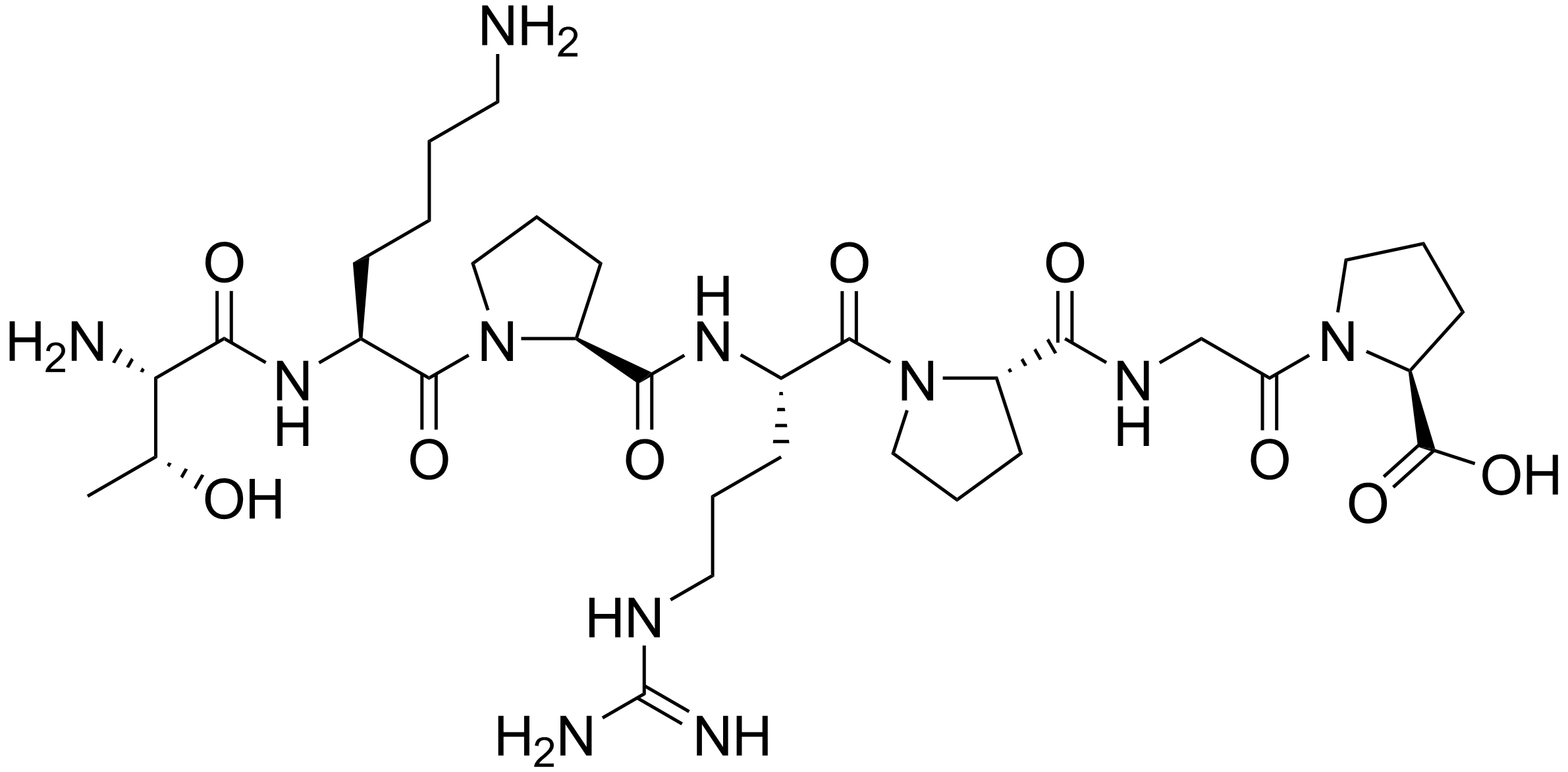

Clinical data
- Other names: Selanc; L-threonyl-L-lysyl-L-prolyl-L-arginyl-L-prolylglycyl-L-Proline
- Routes of administration: Nasal muscosa, IV

Legal status
- Legal status: In general: unscheduled

Identifiers
- IUPAC name: 1-[2-({1-[2-({1-[6-Amino-2-(2-amino-3-hydroxy-butyrylamino)-hexanoyl]-pyrrolidine-2-carbonyl}-amino)-5-guanidino-pentanoyl]-pyrrolidine-2-carbonyl}-amino)-acetyl]-pyrrolidine-2-carboxylic acid
- CAS Number: 129954-34-3
- PubChem CID: 11765600
- ChemSpider: 9940290
- UNII: TS9JR8EP1G
- CompTox Dashboard (EPA): DTXSID701029276

Chemical and physical data
- Formula: C_{33}H_{57}N_{11}O_{9}
- Molar mass: 751.887 g·mol^{−1}
- 3D model (JSmol): Interactive image
- SMILES: NCCCCC(C(=O)N1CCCC1C(=O)NC(C(=O)N2CCCC2C(=O)NCC(=O)N3CCCC3C(=O)O)CCCNC(=N)N)NC(C(C(C)O)N)=O
- InChI: InChI=1S/C33H57N11O9/c1-19(45)26(35)29(49)41-20(8-2-3-13-34)30(50)44-17-6-11-23(44)28(48)40-21(9-4-14-38-33(36)37)31(51)43-16-5-10-22(43)27(47)39-18-25(46)42-15-7-12-24(42)32(52)53/h19-24,26,45H,2-18,34-35H2,1H3,(H,39,47)(H,40,48)(H,41,49)(H,52,53)(H4,36,37,38)/t19-,20+,21+,22+,23+,24+,26+/m1/s1; Key:JTDTXGMXNXBGBZ-UHFFFAOYSA-N

Selank (Russian: Cеланк) is a nootropic anxiolytic peptide based drug developed by the Institute of Molecular Genetics of the Russian Academy of Sciences. Selank is a heptapeptide with the sequence Thr-Lys-Pro-Arg-Pro-Gly-Pro (TKPRPGP). It is a synthetic analogue of the human tuftsin.

== Pharmacology ==
Selank is a synthetic analogue of the immunomodulatory peptide tuftsin; as such, it mimics many of its effects. It has been shown to modulate the expression of Interleukin-6 (IL-6) and affect the balance of T helper cell cytokines. It has been shown in Wistar rats to influence the concentration of monoamine neurotransmitters and induce metabolism of serotonin. Selank has also been found to rapidly elevate the expression of brain-derived neurotrophic factor (BDNF) in the hippocampus of rats.

Selank, as well as a related peptide drug, Semax, have been found to inhibit enzymes involved in the degradation of enkephalins and other endogenous regulatory peptides, and this action may be involved in their effects. It has also been found to affect the activity of carboxypeptidase H and phenylmethylsulfonylfluoride-inhibited carboxypeptidase in rat nervous system tissue.

Selank has been found to produce antidepressant-like effects in animal models of depression and anhedonia.

== Clinical trials ==
In clinical studies, Selank has been investigated for its potential effects on cognitive function and anxiety. It has also been compared with traditional anxiolytic drugs such as benzodiazepines and barbiturates.

Selank is closely related to Semax, a nootropic also developed by same Institute of Molecular Genetics of the Russian Academy of Sciences. Both drugs are currently available in Russian and Ukrainian pharmacies.

As with all lyophilized peptides, it needs refrigeration to remain stable within sterile water solutions, such as bacteriostatic water concentrations.

== See also ==
- Afobazole
- Bemethyl
- FGL-S
- Mebicar
- Semax
- List of Russian drugs
