= Semax =

Chemical compound

Clinical data
- Trade names: Semax
- Other names: L-Methionyl-L-α-glutamylhistidyl-L-phenylalanyl-L-prolylglycyl-L-proline, (Pro^{8},Gly^{9},Pro^{10})ACTH-(4-10), H-Met-Glu-His-Phe-Pro-Gly-Pro-OH, MEHFPGP, H-MEHFPGP-OH
- ATC code: N06BX

Legal status
- Legal status: US: Not FDA approved; unscheduled

Identifiers
- IUPAC name: (2S)-1-[2-{[(2S)-1-[(2S)-2-{[2-{[(2S)-2-{[(2S)-2-amino-4-methylsulfanylbutanoyl]amino}-4-carboxybutanoyl]amino}-3-(1H-imidazol-5-yl)propanoyl]amino}-3-phenylpropanoyl]pyrrolidine-2-carbonyl]amino}acetyl]pyrrolidine-2-carboxylic acid
- CAS Number: 80714-61-0 4037-01-8
- PubChem CID: 122178
- ChemSpider: 108969
- UNII: I5FAL2585H
- CompTox Dashboard (EPA): DTXSID601001439

Chemical and physical data
- Formula: C_{37}H_{51}N_{9}O_{10}S
- Molar mass: 813.93 g·mol^{−1}
- 3D model (JSmol): Interactive image
- SMILES: O=C(N[C@@H](CCC(O)=O)C(N[C@@H](CC1=CNC=N1)C(N[C@@H](CC2=CC=CC=C2)C(N3[C@@H](CCC3)C(NCC(N4[C@@H](CCC4)C(O)=O)=O)=O)=O)=O)=O)[C@H](CCSC)N
- InChI: InChI=1S/C37H51N9O10S/c1-57-16-13-24(38)32(50)42-25(11-12-31(48)49)33(51)43-26(18-23-19-39-21-41-23)34(52)44-27(17-22-7-3-2-4-8-22)36(54)46-15-5-9-28(46)35(53)40-20-30(47)45-14-6-10-29(45)37(55)56/h2-4,7-8,19,21,24-29H,5-6,9-18,20,38H2,1H3,(H,39,41)(H,40,53)(H,42,50)(H,43,51)(H,44,52)(H,48,49)(H,55,56)/t24-,25-,26?,27-,28-,29-/m0/s1; Key:AFEHBIGDWIGTEH-CXFOGXNKSA-N

Semax (Russian: СЕМАКС), an abbreviation of "seven amino acids", (Russian: СЕМь АминоКиСлот, romanized: Sem aminokislot) is a medication which is used in Eastern Europe for the treatment of a broad range of conditions like brain trauma but predominantly for its claimed nootropic, neuroprotective, and neurorestorative effects.

The mechanism of action of Semax is unknown. It might interact with certain melanocortin receptors or inhibit enkephalinase enzymes. Chemically, Semax is a peptide and a synthetic analogue of a fragment of adrenocorticotropic hormone (ACTH).

Semax was first described in scientific literature in 1991. Although used as a prescription drug in Russia, Semax has not been evaluated, approved for use, or marketed in most other countries. The drug is widely sold by online vendors and used as a purported nootropic (cognitive enhancer).

== Medical uses ==
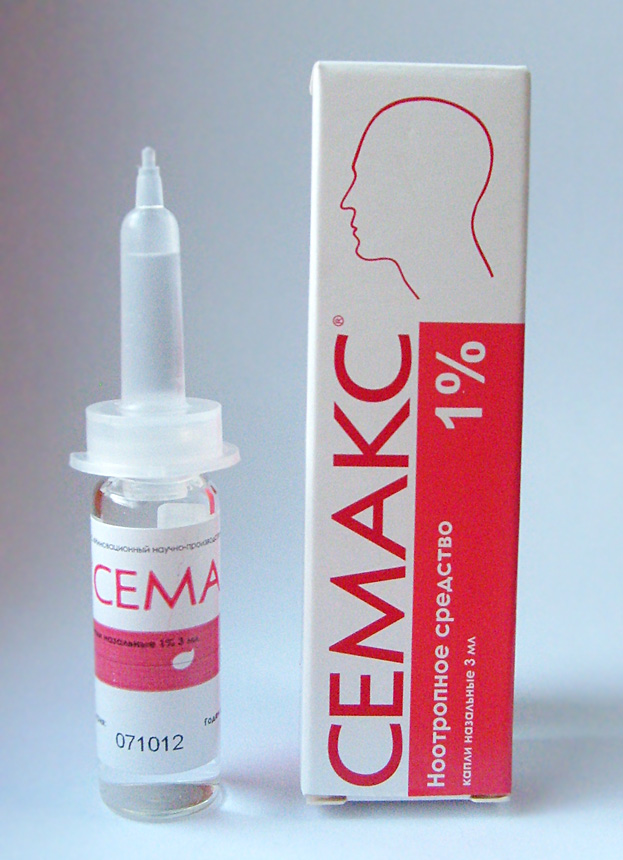
Semax 1% from Russia.

Semax has undergone extensive study in Russia and is on the Russian List of Vital & Essential Drugs approved by the Russian Federation government on 7 December 2011. Medical uses for Semax include treatment of stroke, transient ischemic attack, memory and cognitive disorders, peptic ulcers, optic nerve disease, and to boost the immune system.

== Pharmacology ==
Semax is a heptapeptide and synthetic analogue of a fragment of adrenocorticotropic hormone (ACTH), ACTH (4-10), of the following amino acid sequence: Met-Glu-His-Phe-Pro-Gly-Pro (MEHFPGP in single-letter form).

In animals, Semax rapidly elevates the levels and expression of brain-derived neurotrophic factor (BDNF) and its signaling receptor tropomyosin receptor kinase B (TrkB) in the hippocampus, and rapidly activates serotonergic and dopaminergic brain systems. Accordingly, it has been found to produce antidepressant-like and anxiolytic-like effects, attenuate the behavioral effects of exposure to chronic stress, and potentiate the locomotor activity produced by D-amphetamine. As such, it has been suggested that Semax may be effective in the treatment of depression.

Though the exact mechanism of action of Semax is unclear, there is evidence that it may act through melanocortin receptors. Specifically, there is a report of Semax competitively antagonizing the action of α-melanocyte-stimulating hormone (α-MSH) at the MC_{4} and MC_{5} receptors in both in vitro and in vivo experimental conditions, indicating that it may act as an antagonist or partial agonist of these receptors. (&alpha-MSH acts as a full agonist of all five melanocortin receptors). Semax did not antagonize α-MSH at the MC_{3} receptor, though this receptor could still be a target of the drug. As for the MC_{1} and MC_{2} receptors, they were not assayed.

In addition to actions at receptors, Semax, as well as a related peptide drug, Selank, have been found to inhibit enzymes involved in the degradation of enkephalins and other endogenous regulatory peptides (IC_{50} = 10 μM), though the clinical significance of this property is uncertain.

As a peptide, Semax has poor oral bioavailability and hence is administered parenterally as a nasal spray or subcutaneous injection.

== See also ==
- Adamax
- Selank
- PTD4-PI3KAc
- 9-Methyl-β-carboline (9-Me-BC)
- Bromantane
- List of Russian drugs
