= Tripeptide =

Peptide consisting of three amino acids joined by peptide bonds

A tripeptide (example Val-Gly-Ala) with green marked amino end (L-Valine) and blue marked carboxyl end (L-Alanine)

A tripeptide is a peptide derived from three amino acids joined by two or sometimes three peptide bonds. As for proteins, the function of peptides is determined by the constituent amino acids and their sequence. In terms of scientific investigations, the dominant tripeptide is glutathione (γ-L-Glutamyl-L-cysteinylglycine), which serves many roles in many forms of life.

== Examples ==
- Eisenin (pGlu-Gln-Ala-OH) is a peptide with immunological activity that is isolated from the Japanese marine alga (Eisenia bicyclis) which more commonly is known as Arame
- KPV tripeptide (Pro-Val-Lys) has antiinflammatory effects and is used in skincare products.
- GHK-Cu (glycyl-L-histidyl-L-lysine) is a human copper binding peptide with wound healing and skin remodeling activity, which is used in anti-aging cosmetics and more commonly referred to as copper peptide
- Lactotripeptides (Ile-Pro-Pro and Val-Pro-Pro) found in milk products, act as ACE inhibitors
- Leupeptin (N-acetyl-L-leucyl-L-leucyl-L-argininal) is a protease inhibitor that also acts as an inhibitor of calpain
- Melanostatin (prolyl-leucyl-glycinamide) is a peptide hormone produced in the hypothalamus that inhibits the release of melanocyte-stimulating hormone (MSH)
- Ophthalmic acid (L-γ-glutamyl-L-α-aminobutyryl-glycine) is an analogue of glutathione isolated from crystalline lens
- Norophthalmic acid (y-glutamyl-alanyl-glycine) is an analogue of glutathione (L-cysteine replaced by L-alanine) isolated from crystalline lens
- Thyrotropin-releasing hormone (TRH, thyroliberin or protirelin) (L-pyroglutamyl-L-histidinyl-L-prolinamide) is a peptide hormone that stimulates the release of thyroid-stimulating hormone and prolactin by the anterior pituitary
- ACV (δ-(L-α-aminoadipyl)-L-Cys-D-Val) is a key biosynthetic precursor to penicillin and cephalosporin.
- Vesugen (Lys-Glu-Asp)
- Pinealon (Glu-Asp-Arg)
- Chonluten (Glu-Asp-Gly)
- PGP (Pro-Gly-Pro) a neutrophil chemoattractant.
- Glycyl-prolyl-hydroxyproline (Gly-Pro-Hyp)

== See also ==
- Dipeptide
- Tetrapeptide
