= Epitalon =

Synthetic peptide

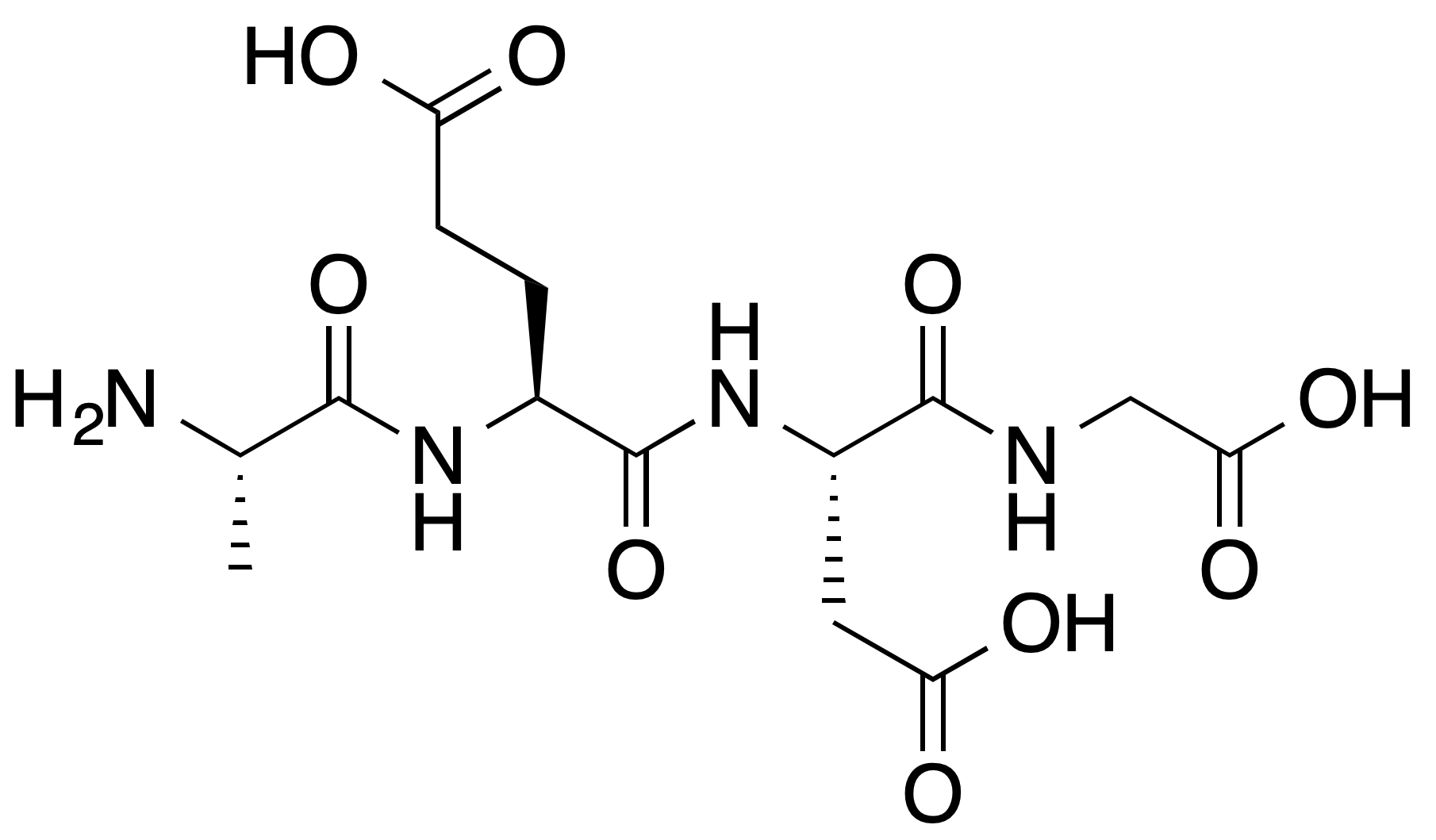

Names
- IUPAC name (4S)-4-[[(2S)-2-aminopropanoyl]amino]-5-[[(2S)-3-carboxy-1-(carboxymethylamino)-1-oxopropan-2-yl]amino]-5-oxopentanoic acid
- Other names: Epithalon; Epithalone; Ala-Glu-Asp-Gly; L-Alanyl-L-glutamyl-L-aspartyl-glycine; UNII-O65P17785G

Identifiers
CAS Number	307297-39-8
3D model (JSmol)	Interactive image
ChemSpider	189872
MeSH	C421253
PubChem CID	219042
UNII	O65P17785G
CompTox Dashboard (EPA)	DTXSID80952957
- InChI: InChI=1S/C14H22N4O9/c1-6(15)12(25)17-7(2-3-9(19)20)14(27)18-8(4-10(21)22)13(26)16-5-11(23)24/h6-8H,2-5,15H2,1H3,(H,16,26)(H,17,25)(H,18,27)(H,19,20)(H,21,22)(H,23,24)/t6-,7-,8-/m0/s1 Key: HGHOBRRUMWJWCU-FXQIFTODSA-N
- SMILES: CC(C(=O)NC(CCC(=O)O)C(=O)NC(CC(=O)O)C(=O)NCC(=O)O)N

Properties
Chemical formula	C_{14}H_{22}N_{4}O_{9}
Molar mass	390.349
- Except where otherwise noted, data are given for materials in their standard state (at 25 °C [77 °F], 100 kPa). Infobox references

Epitalon is a synthetic peptide, telomerase activator, and putative anti-aging compound, which was identified as the putative active component of a bovine pineal gland extract known as epithalamin.

Most studies on epitalon and epithalamin have been conducted by the St. Petersburg Institute of Bioregulation and Gerontology, primarily overseen by Vladimir Khavinson, in Russia, though in recent years research using epitalon has started to be conducted elsewhere, focusing mainly on its ability to extend telomere length.

== Chemistry ==
Epitalon is a tetrapeptide with the amino acid sequence Ala-Glu-Asp-Gly and the molecular formula C_{14}H_{22}N_{4}O_{9}.

== Biological effects ==
=== Studies in vitro ===
Epitalon appears to induce telomere elongation via increased telomerase activity in human somatic cells in vitro, based on a study in human fibroblast cell cultures.

Elongation of telomeres by epitalon was sufficient to surpass the Hayflick limit in a cell culture of human fetal fibroblast cells, extending their proliferative potential from termination at the 34th passage in the control cell population to beyond the 44th passage in the treated cell population, while increasing the lengths of their telomeres to levels comparable to those of cells in the original culture.

Epitalon induces decondensation of heterochromatin near the centromeres in cultured lymphocytes originating from samples taken from humans of ages 76 to 80 years.

Epitalon appears to inhibit the synthesis of the MMP9 protein in vitro in aging skin fibroblasts.

=== Animal studies in vivo ===
An in vivo study in aging mice found that epitalon treatment significantly reduced the incidence of chromosomal aberrations, both for wild-type mice and for mice characterized by an accelerated aging phenotype, which is consistent with increases in telomere length.

Another study in aging rats found that epitalon increased the activities of the antioxidant enzymes superoxide dismutase, glutathione peroxidase, and glutathione-S-transferase.

Epitalon reduced the number of spontaneous tumors and the number of metastases in mice that did develop spontaneous tumors in an experiment on one-year-old female mice of the C3H/He inbred strain, and is speculated to have oncostatic and anti-metastatic properties.

In a study of chickens subjected to neonatal hypophysectomy and subsequent maturation, epitalon promoted the recovery of the morphological structures of the thymus, as well as the structure and function of the thyroid gland.

Epitalon appears to increase the proliferation of lymphocytes in the thymus, putatively increasing production of interferon gamma by T-cells.

Another study in aging rats demonstrated extension of life span for rats subjected to constant illumination or to a natural light regimen typical of northern regions.

=== Human clinical studies ===
In human clinical studies, epitalon and epithalamin both significantly increased telomere lengths in the blood cells of patients of ages 60–65 and 75–80, and their efficacy was comparable to one another.

Epitalon and epithalamin appear to restore melatonin secretion by the pineal gland in both aged monkeys and humans.

A human clinical trial conducted on a sample of retinitis pigmentosa patients found that epitalon produced a positive clinical effect in 90% of cases in the treated group.

In another human clinical trial conducted on a sample of pulmonary tuberculosis patients, epitalon did not appear to correct pre-existing structural aberrations of chromosomes associated with telomere degradation, but did appear to exert a protective effect against the future development of additional chromosomal aberrations.

A human prospective cohort study conducted on a sample of 266 people over age 60 demonstrated that treatment with epithalamin, the pineal gland extract upon which epitalon is based, produced a 1.6–1.8-fold reduction in mortality during the following 6 years, a 2.5-fold reduction in mortality when combined with thymalin, and a 4.1-fold reduction in mortality when combined with thymalin and administered annually instead of only once at study onset.

Another prospective cohort study on a sample of 79 coronary patients spanning in excess of 12 years found improved metrics of physical endurance, circadian rhythm, and carbohydrate and lipid metabolism in the treated group relative to the control group following 3 years of biannual epithalamin treatments, as well as a 50% lower rate of cardiovascular mortality, a 50% lower rate of cardiovascular failure and serious respiratory disease, and a 28% lower rate of overall mortality.

== See also ==
- Astragalus
- Angiotensin (1-7)
- Cycloastragenol
- Cortagen
- GHK-Cu
- KPV tripeptide
- Livagen
- Pinealon
- Thymulin
- Vladimir Khavinson
