= SHMOOSE =

Mitochondria-derived microprotein discovered in 2022

SHMOOSE (Small Human Mitochondrial ORF Over SErine tRNA) is a mitochondrial DNA-encoded microprotein identified through genetic and proteomic studies linking mitochondrial variation to Alzheimer's disease and mitochondrial biology.

== Discovery ==
SHMOOSE was first described by the Pinchas Cohen lab in 2022 in a study searching for mitochondrial genome variants associated with Alzheimer's disease. Researchers performing a mitochondrial-wide association study (MiWAS) identified the single nucleotide polymorphism rs2853499 within a previously unannotated small open reading frame (sORF) in the mitochondrial genome. This sORF encodes a previously unrecognized microprotein, later named SHMOOSE. Using mass spectrometry, two unique peptide fragments corresponding to SHMOOSE were detected in mitochondrial fractions, representing the first mass spectrometry–based detection of a mitochondrial-encoded microprotein.

== Coding sequence and peptide ==
The SHMOOSE coding sequence is located in the human mitochondrial genome, overlapping the serine tRNA region and the MT-ND5 gene, which encodes a subunit of mitochondrial Complex I. The sORF containing rs2853499 encodes a peptide of 58 amino acids: MPPCLTTWLSQLLKDNSYPLVLGPKNFGATPNKSNNHAHYYNHPNPDFPNSPHPYHPR.

== Function ==
Functional studies indicate that SHMOOSE localizes to mitochondria and can influence mitochondrial activity. In vitro and animal models have shown that SHMOOSE can bind to mitochondrial proteins such as mitofilin, localize to the inner mitochondrial membrane, and affect mitochondrial bioenergetics, including oxygen consumption. In neuronal models, SHMOOSE has been reported to modulate responses to amyloid-β toxicity and cell stress.

== Clinical significance ==
Levels of SHMOOSE-derived peptides measured in human cerebrospinal fluid have been reported to correlate with age, cerebrospinal fluid tau, and measures of brain white matter, linking SHMOOSE to markers of neurodegeneration. A mutation within the SHMOOSE gene partially inactivates the microprotein and is associated with a 30% higher risk for Alzheimer's disease. The mutation is found in nearly 25% of people with European ancestry.

A 2026 Frontiers in Nutrition study led by Pinchas Cohen and Roberto Vicinanza of the USC Leonard Davis School of Gerontology showed a correlation between better adherence to the Mediterranean diet and higher circulating levels of SHMOOSE as well as another mitochondrial micropeptide, humanin.

== See also ==
- Humanin
- MOTS-c
- Small humanin-like peptide
