= Tertomotide =

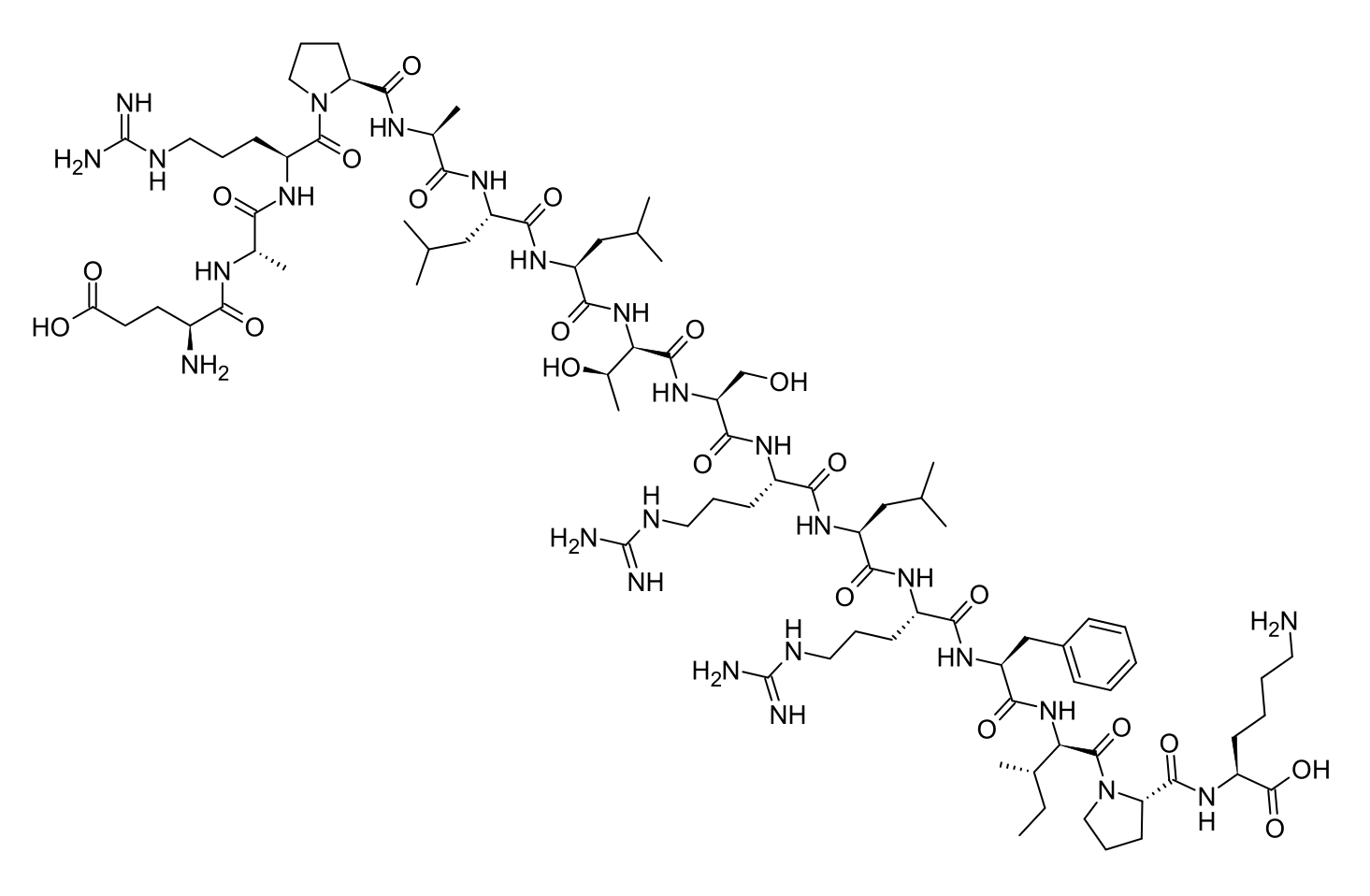

Identifiers
- IUPAC name: (2S)-6-amino-2-[[(2S)-1-[(2S,3S)-2-[[(2S)-2-[[(2S)-2-[[(2S)-2-[[(2S)-2-[[(2S)-2-[[(2S,3R)-2-[[(2S)-2-[[(2S)-2-[[(2S)-2-[[(2S)-1-[(2S)-2-[[(2S)-2-[[(2S)-2-amino-4-carboxybutanoyl]amino]propanoyl]amino]-5-(diaminomethylideneamino)pentanoyl]pyrrolidine-2-carbonyl]amino]propanoyl]amino]-4-methylpentanoyl]amino]-4-methylpentanoyl]amino]-3-hydroxybutanoyl]amino]-3-hydroxypropanoyl]amino]-5-(diaminomethylideneamino)pentanoyl]amino]-4-methylpentanoyl]amino]-5-(diaminomethylideneamino)pentanoyl]amino]-3-phenylpropanoyl]amino]-3-methylpentanoyl]pyrrolidine-2-carbonyl]amino]hexanoic acid
- CAS Number: 915019-08-8
- PubChem CID: 56843375
- UNII: 55R7RG342O

Chemical and physical data
- Formula: C_{85}H_{146}N_{26}O_{21}
- Molar mass: 1868.264 g·mol^{−1}
- 3D model (JSmol): Interactive image
- SMILES: CC[C@H](C)[C@@H](C(=O)N1CCC[C@H]1C(=O)N[C@@H](CCCCN)C(=O)O)NC(=O)[C@H](CC2=CC=CC=C2)NC(=O)[C@H](CCCN=C(N)N)NC(=O)[C@H](CC(C)C)NC(=O)[C@H](CCCN=C(N)N)NC(=O)[C@H](CO)NC(=O)[C@H]([C@@H](C)O)NC(=O)[C@H](CC(C)C)NC(=O)[C@H](CC(C)C)NC(=O)[C@H](C)NC(=O)[C@@H]3CCCN3C(=O)[C@H](CCCN=C(N)N)NC(=O)[C@H](C)NC(=O)[C@H](CCC(=O)O)N
- InChI: InChI=1S/C85H146N26O21/c1-12-47(8)65(81(130)111-38-22-30-63(111)78(127)102-56(82(131)132)25-16-17-33-86)108-75(124)60(42-51-23-14-13-15-24-51)106-71(120)53(26-18-34-94-83(88)89)99-72(121)58(40-45(4)5)104-70(119)54(27-19-35-95-84(90)91)100-76(125)61(43-112)107-79(128)66(50(11)113)109-74(123)59(41-46(6)7)105-73(122)57(39-44(2)3)103-68(117)49(10)98-77(126)62-29-21-37-110(62)80(129)55(28-20-36-96-85(92)93)101-67(116)48(9)97-69(118)52(87)31-32-64(114)115/h13-15,23-24,44-50,52-63,65-66,112-113H,12,16-22,25-43,86-87H2,1-11H3,(H,97,118)(H,98,126)(H,99,121)(H,100,125)(H,101,116)(H,102,127)(H,103,117)(H,104,119)(H,105,122)(H,106,120)(H,107,128)(H,108,124)(H,109,123)(H,114,115)(H,131,132)(H4,88,89,94)(H4,90,91,95)(H4,92,93,96)/t47-,48-,49-,50+,52-,53-,54-,55-,56-,57-,58-,59-,60-,61-,62-,63-,65-,66-/m0/s1; Key:WZJRQXZSYQYFJV-QAXVQDKQSA-N

Tertomotide (GV1001, EARPALLTSRLRFIPK) is a 16-amino acid peptide based on the 616‑626 position fragment of human telomerase reverse transcriptase protein (hTERT). It was originally developed as a possible subunit vaccine for various types of cancer, as it can trigger immune attack against cancer cells which overexpress telomerase, a common mutation found in malignant tumors. However, it does not block telomerase activity in healthy tissue and has been found to produce various useful activities in its own right including antiviral, antiinflammatory and antidepressant effects, and has been trialled for numerous other medical applications including Alzheimer's disease as well as its original role in the treatment of cancer.

== See also ==
- BPC-157
- FOXO4-DRI
- Humanin
- Mechano growth factor
- TB-500
- Link-N
- PNC-27
