= C38H68N10O14 =

The molecular formula C_{38}H_{68}N_{10}O_{14} may refer to:

- Ac-SDKP
- TB-500
