= Peptide therapeutics =

Peptide used as medication

- Drug class
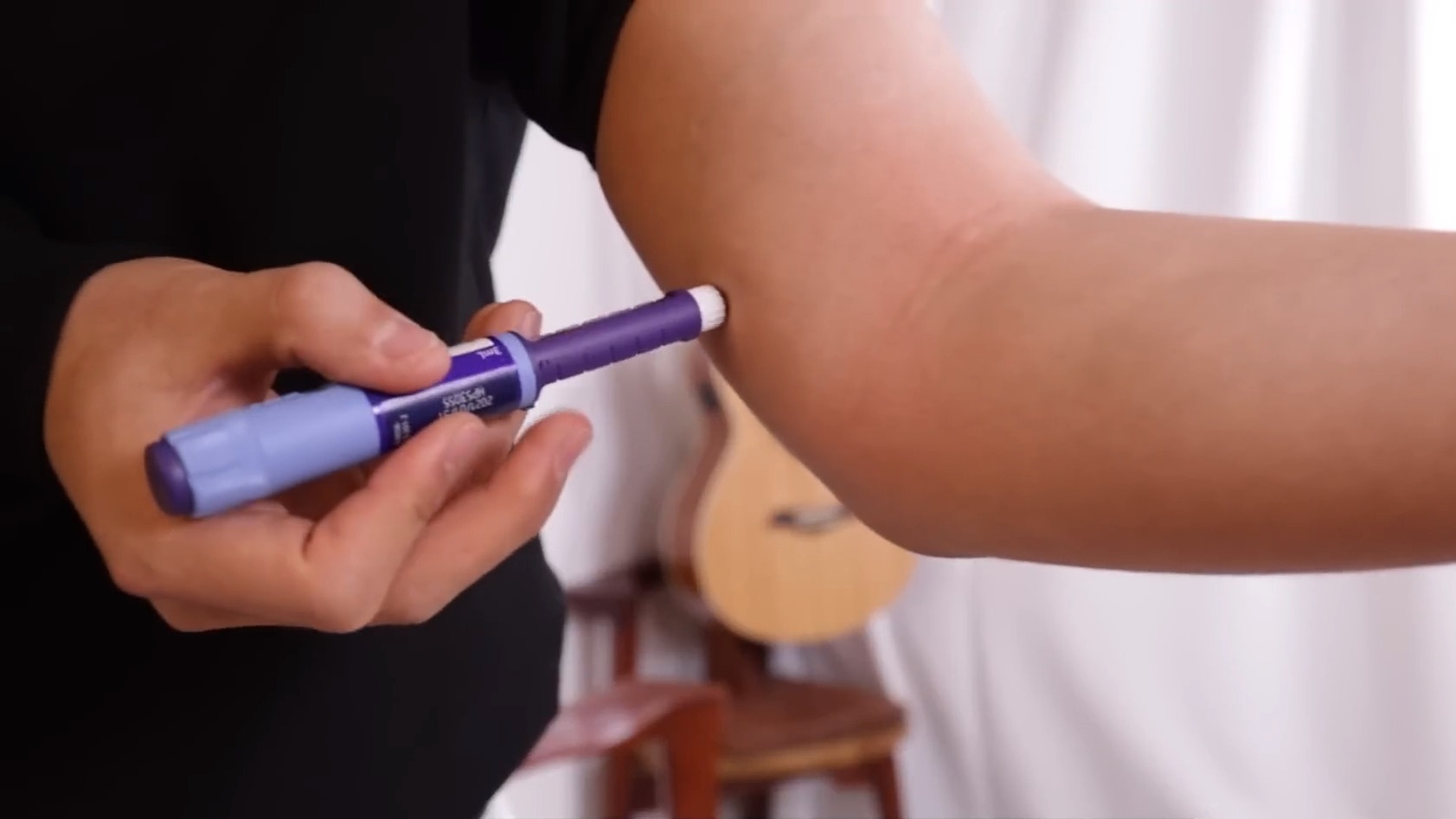
- The peptide "Liraglutide" being injected

Legal status

Peptide therapeutics are peptides or polypeptides (oligomers or short polymers of amino acids) which are used for the treatment of diseases. Naturally occurring peptides may serve as hormones, growth factors, neurotransmitters, ion channel ligands, and anti-infectives; peptide therapeutics mimic such functions.

The presence of a peptide structure in a drug or chemical is not enough information to determine its effectiveness or its safety, or to draw conclusions about the overall effectiveness or safety of other substances sharing that particular structure.

In 2025 and 2026, off-label peptide use and the use of unapproved peptides became popular on social media. However, these peptides have unconfirmed safety and efficacy, and are not a recognised medical treatment.

== Differentiation from internet peptides ==
Peptide therapeutics differ from the mid 2020s peptide trend; peptides (some off-label and some illegal) with unconfirmed safety and efficacy have become popular through social media influencers.

Peptides are fragile, and thus are not generally absorbed through skin. However, emerging techniques such as nano-emulsion allows for some uptake of peptides through the skin. There is insufficient evidence for the safety or efficacy of most injected peptides. Many peptides have only been tested on lab grown cells, and have not yet progressed to testing in animals or humans.

One off-label use of peptides is circumventing bans on the prescription of human growth hormone (HGH) by using tesamorelin or sermorelin; that approach however carries the same downsides as a regular HGH prescription, including increased risk of cancer, diabetes, and abnormal bone growth. Another influencer promoted peptide is TB-500, which has not undergone human testing and which at high levels is associated with tumor development.

The United States, under the direction of Robert F. Kennedy Jr., has sought to deregulate various peptides. Many Americans have gained access to "research" peptides sourced from China, which are not intended for human use. In July 2026, an advisory panel to the FDA (with 14 members, six of whom were peptide sellers), advised the FDA to deregulate six peptides, including BPC-157. The NYTimes notes that "the FDA has warned that many peptides pose 'serious safety risks' because of potential impurities and immune reactions."

== Examples ==
The diabetic medication liraglutide incorporates a lipid chain to extend plasma circulation and prolong bio-availability. Liraglutide is a GLP-1 agonist drug that self-assembles into an alpha-helical structure, and it requires once a day administration. Lipid conjugation of a palmitoyl chain to a lysine residue at position 26 of Liraglutide results in an extended half-life (around 13–14 hours) in the blood. This is due to the palmitoyl chain allowing non covalent binding to albumin, which delays proteolytic attack by DPP IV and also rapid renal clearance. Furthermore, the addition of the lipid chain could further prolong half-life by sterically hindering the DPP IV enzyme from degradation.

Another peptide known to self-assemble is the octapeptide lanreotide. This compound is a synthetic analogue of the peptide hormone somatostatin and it is used to treat acromegaly (a condition where the body produced too much growth hormone). In water, Lanreotide self-assembles into monodisperse liquid crystalline nanotubes. The nanotubes are made up of dimers that self-assemble into a 2D crystal, which is held together by lateral chain interactions, and also by anti-parallel ß-sheets.

Further insight into how self-assembly and peptide hormones are related has been provided by studies on self-assembling amyloid structures formed by peptide hormones and neuropeptides. Peptide hormones and neuropeptides form dense-cored aggregates that pack into dense-core vesicles (DCVs), which are used to temporarily store peptide messengers in secretory cells. When dense-core vesicles are triggered, they release the stored information into the blood or extracellular space, resulting in amyloid disassembly, in order for action. Therefore, for these types of peptides, reversibility of peptide aggregation is essential for their function.

== Stability ==
Many strategies have been employed to increase the stability of peptide drugs, because although they have so many desirable characteristics, they are short lived in the body as a result of rapid degradation and clearance. With half-lives of some peptides and proteins only being a few minutes, they are very ineffective in drug delivery. Mechanisms involved in their clearance include peripheral blood mediated elimination by proteolysis, renal and hepatic elimination, and also receptor-mediated endocytosis. One of the main reasons for such rapid clearance is molecular weight. Molecules that have a low molecular weight (40-50 kDa) are rapidly cleared by renal filtration via the glomerular filtration barrier (GBM) into the urine. As a result of this, increasing the size of a peptide drug is a good starting point to improve half-life.

Peptide modifications to extend half-life include PEGylation, glycosylation, cyclization, serum albumin binding, and lipidation. PEGylation is the attachment of polyethylene glycol (PEG) chains to the peptide via covalent bonds, helping to increase molecular weight, and limit enzymatic degradation as a result of steric hindrance caused by adding the PEG. PEGylation offers a number of benefits for pharmaceutical applications such as improved water solubility, high mobility in solution, as well as low toxicity and low immunogenicity. This does however depend on the molecular weight of the attached PEG. PEGylation as a method to improve half-life has been successfully demonstrated many times; in one example it shows that site specific mono-PEGylation of GLP-1 led to a 16-fold increase in plasma half-life time in rats. On the other hand, covalently attaching PEG can often lead to loss of biological activity.

Another chemical modification is the attachment of glycosyl (carbohydrate) units to the peptide to help with peptide delivery to target sites. The introduction of carbohydrates to peptides can alter the physiological properties, to improve bioavailability. Advantages of this technique include increased metabolic stability, and facilitated transport across cell membranes, although of the most favourable aspects is their ability to promote oral absorption. Peptides have a very low oral availability (less than 1–2%), as a result of insufficient absorption and rapid degradation and clearance, thus making this method an attractive one. N- and O-glycosylation in which carbohydrates are attached to the peptide are naturally occurring, where N-glycosylation occurs through the amine group of an asparagine residue to form an amide bond. O-glycosylation occurs via serine or threonine residues, where the oxygen atom on the side chain binds to the carbohydrate through an ether bond. There is also non-natural glycosylation, known as chemical glycosylation, which involves the attachment of carbohydrate units to different amino acid residues at the N-terminus of the peptide's sequence. A further way of carrying out glycosylation is by using enzymes, known as chemo-enzymatic glycosylation. This method is used for complex chemical synthesis. Chemical and chemo-enzymatic methods can be used for the synthesis of glycopeptides and glycoproteins.

Cyclization can also be used as a method to decrease proteolytic degradation and prolong half-life, to make the peptide conformation more rigid to hinder enzymatic cleavage. This method can however lead to loss of biological function due to the reduced flexibility making the peptide inactive. For example, side chain to side chain cyclization between asparagine (position 8) and lysine (position 12), of a growth regulating factor (GRF) analogue was found to increase the half-life from 17 minutes to more than 2 hours.

Another way to extend half-life do is to bind serum albumin to the peptide. Human serum albumin is the most abundant plasma protein with a molecular weight of 66.4 kDa, and it is involved in many essential bodily functions to maintain homoeostasis. As a result, albumin binding would significantly increase the molecular weight of the peptide, restricting it from being filtered into the urine by the GBM. Serum albumin has an extraordinary long half-life of 2–4 weeks which is much longer than other plasma proteins, due to it binding to the neonatal Fc receptor (FcRn). Fc receptors are proteins found on the surface of certain cells that help to protect the functions of the immune system, by binding to the Fc region of antibodies, which attach to pathogens and destroy them. This mechanism of the neonatal FcRn involves albumin binding to the FcRn in an acidic pH environment to divert it from degradation in the lysosomal compartment of the cell, and redirecting it to the plasma membrane, where it is released back into the blood plasma due to neutral pH.

Lipidation is a further technique to use when improving peptide stability and half-life. Attaching a lipid chain to the peptide head group has been found to inhibit proteolytic attack due to the lipid chain non-covalently interacting with serum albumin to increase the molecular weight, thus reducing renal filtration. Studies on a lipidated analogue of insulin, detemir, revealed a prolonged action as a result of its affinity for human serum albumin. As well as this, lipidation has been shown to enhance the interaction of peptides with cell membranes, allowing them to be up taken into the cell more readily compared to the peptide lacking the lipid moiety. There are three types of lipidation, and they differ based on the bond formation methods between the lipid and the peptide: amidation, esterification (S- or O-) and S-bond (ether or disulphide) formation. Amidation and O-esterification form strong covalent bonds that are irreversible, whereas the other two methods are weak and reversible covalent bonds. The method used, as well as the alkyl/lipid chain, position of lipidation, and the spacer used, all have significant impacts on physiochemical properties and bioactivity. The level of lipophilicity can be significantly modulated by lipidation, and since lipophilicity is detrimental for the absorption, distribution, metabolism, and excretion of drugs, it provides a way of fine tuning peptides for use in therapeutics.
