= Growth-hormone-releasing hormone receptor =

Receptor protein that binds with somatcrinin

GHRHR

Identifiers
- Aliases: GHRHR, GHRFR, GRFR, IGHD1B, growth hormone releasing hormone receptor, IGHD4
- External IDs: OMIM: 139191; MGI: 95710; GeneCards: GHRHR
Available structures
PDB	Ortholog search: PDBe RCSB
PDB	List of PDB id codes 2XDG

Gene location (Human)
Chr.	Chromosome 7 (human)
Band	7p14.3	Start	30,938,669 bp
Band	7p14.3	End	30,993,254 bp

Gene location (Mouse)
Chr.	Chromosome 6 (mouse)
Band	6 B3|6 27.38 cM	Start	55,353,280 bp
Band	6 B3|6 27.38 cM	End	55,365,515 bp
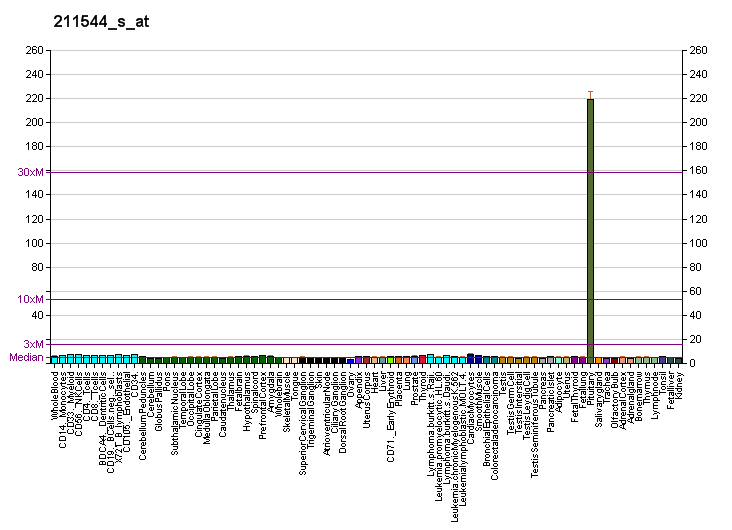

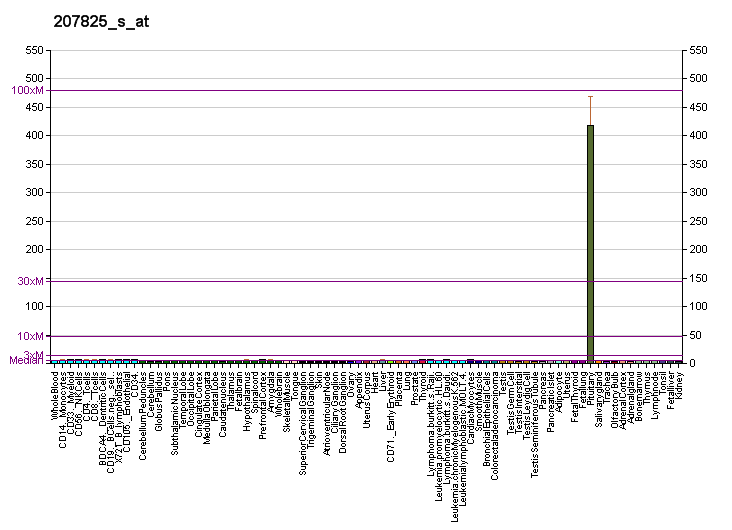

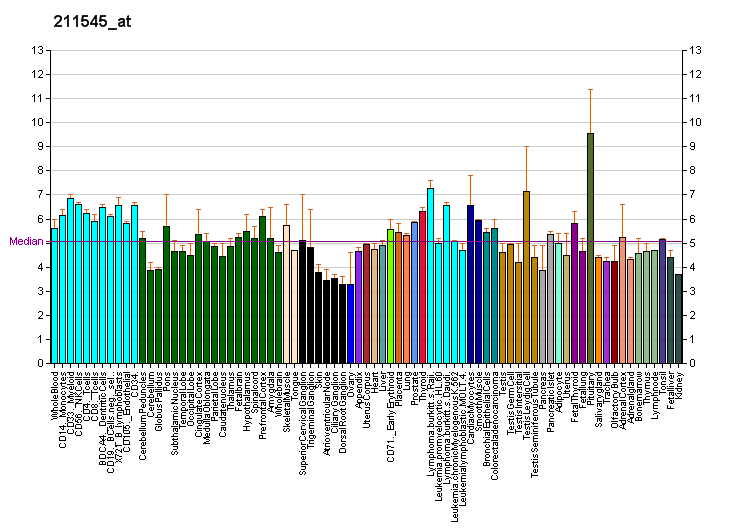
RNA expression pattern
Bgee	Human / Mouse (ortholog); Top expressed in: pituitary gland; anterior pituitary; oocyte; secondary oocyte; hypothalamus; cingulate gyrus; anterior cingulate cortex; amygdala; Descending thoracic aorta; nucleus accumbens / Top expressed in: pituitary gland; anterior pituitary; choroid plexus of fourth ventricle; entorhinal cortex; CA3 field; soleus muscle; proximal tubule; right kidney; yolk sac; tibialis anterior muscle; More reference expression data
BioGPS	More reference expression data
Gene ontology
Molecular function	G protein-coupled receptor activity; growth factor binding; signal transducer activity; peptide hormone binding; protein binding; growth hormone-releasing hormone receptor activity; transmembrane signaling receptor activity; G protein-coupled peptide receptor activity
Cellular component	cytoplasm; integral component of membrane; membrane; nuclear matrix; plasma membrane; secretory granule; cell surface; nuclear inner membrane; sarcolemma; nuclear outer membrane
Biological process	adenylate cyclase-activating G protein-coupled receptor signaling pathway; determination of adult lifespan; adenylate cyclase-modulating G protein-coupled receptor signaling pathway; response to glucocorticoid; cell maturation; adenohypophysis development; water homeostasis; activation of adenylate cyclase activity; response to estrogen; mammary gland development; response to insulin; positive regulation of circadian sleep/wake cycle, non-REM sleep; cell surface receptor signaling pathway; regulation of insulin-like growth factor receptor signaling pathway; positive regulation of insulin-like growth factor receptor signaling pathway; growth hormone secretion; positive regulation of growth hormone secretion; positive regulation of cell population proliferation; positive regulation of multicellular organism growth; cellular response to insulin stimulus; somatotropin secreting cell development; regulation of protein metabolic process; lactation; regulation of intracellular steroid hormone receptor signaling pathway; hormone metabolic process; positive regulation of hormone secretion; cAMP-mediated signaling; cellular response to glucose stimulus; signal transduction; multicellular organismal reproductive process; G protein-coupled receptor signaling pathway
Sources:Amigo / QuickGO
Orthologs
Databases	NCBI: entry; OMA: entry
Species	Human	Mouse
Entrez	2692	14602
Ensembl	ENSG00000106128	ENSMUSG00000004654
UniProt	Q02643	P32082
RefSeq (mRNA)	NM_000823; NM_001009824	NM_001003685
RefSeq (protein)	NP_000814	NP_001003685
Location (UCSC)	Chr 7: 30.94 – 30.99 Mb	Chr 6: 55.35 – 55.37 Mb
PubMed search
- Wikidata
View/Edit Human	View/Edit Mouse

The growth-hormone-releasing hormone receptor (GHRHR) is a G-protein-coupled receptor that binds growth hormone-releasing hormone. The GHRHR activates a Gs protein that causes a cascade of cAMP via adenylate cyclase. GHRHR is distinct from the growth hormone secretagogue receptor (also known as the ghrelin receptor), where growth hormone-releasing peptides act to release growth hormone.

== Function ==
This gene, expressed in the pituitary, encodes a receptor for growth-hormone-releasing hormone. Binding of this hormone to the receptor leads to synthesis and release of growth hormone. Mutations in this gene have been associated with isolated growth-hormone deficiency (IGHD), also known as Dwarfism of Sindh, a disorder characterized by short stature. Many alternate transcriptional splice variants encoding different isoforms have been described, but only two have been characterized to date.

== Ligands ==
=== Agonists ===
- CJC-1295
- Dumorelin
- GHRH (somatorelin)
- Rismorelin
- Sermorelin
- Tesamorelin

=== Antagonists ===
- MZ-5-156
