= Ac-SDKP =

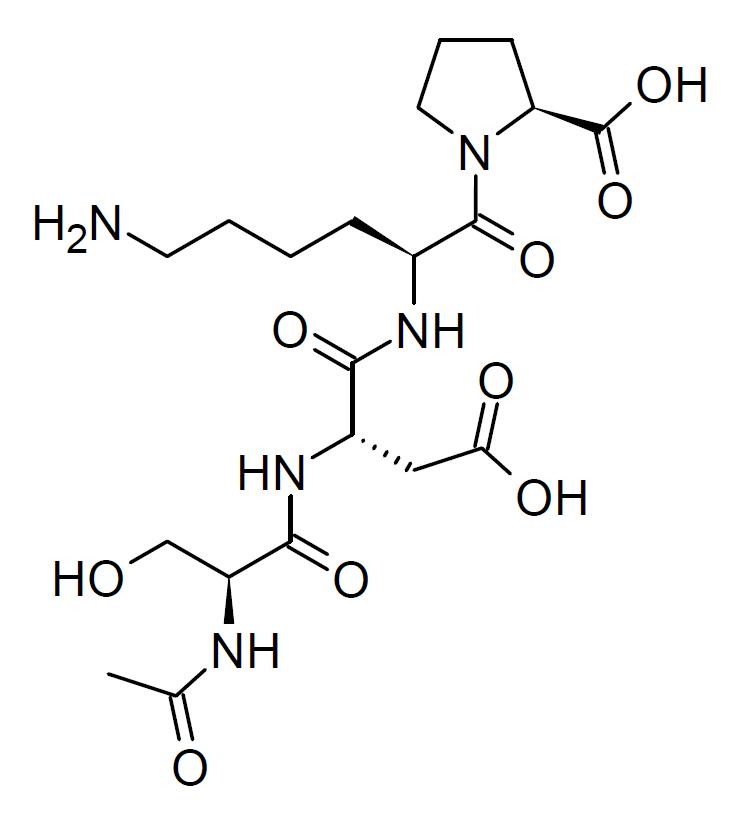

Identifiers
- IUPAC name: (2S)-1-[(2S)-2-[[(2S)-2-[[(2S)-2-acetamido-3-hydroxypropanoyl]amino]-3-carboxypropanoyl]amino]-6-aminohexanoyl]pyrrolidine-2-carboxylic acid
- CAS Number: 120081-14-3
- PubChem CID: 65938
- IUPHAR/BPS: 10060
- ChemSpider: 59343
- UNII: H041538E9P
- ChEBI: CHEBI:191178
- ChEMBL: ChEMBL420741

Chemical and physical data
- Formula: C_{20}H_{33}N_{5}O_{9}
- Molar mass: 487.510 g·mol^{−1}
- 3D model (JSmol): Interactive image
- SMILES: CC(=O)N[C@@H](CO)C(=O)N[C@@H](CC(=O)O)C(=O)N[C@@H](CCCCN)C(=O)N1CCC[C@H]1C(=O)O
- InChI: InChI=1S/C20H33N5O9/c1-11(27)22-14(10-26)18(31)24-13(9-16(28)29)17(30)23-12(5-2-3-7-21)19(32)25-8-4-6-15(25)20(33)34/h12-15,26H,2-10,21H2,1H3,(H,22,27)(H,23,30)(H,24,31)(H,28,29)(H,33,34)/t12-,13-,14-,15-/m0/s1; Key:HJDRXEQUFWLOGJ-AJNGGQMLSA-N

Ac-SDKP (Thymosin Beta 4 Fragment (1–4), Goralatide) is an endogenous tetrapeptide derivative that is the N-acetylated derivative of the fragment composed of amino acids 1-4 derived from cleavage of the N-terminus of the signalling factor thymosin beta-4 by the enzyme prolyl oligopeptidase. It is a selective inhibitor of haematopoietic cell proliferation and has antiinflammatory, anti-fibrotic, and pro-angiogenic properties, with particular applications in preventing the development of kidney fibrosis and cardiac fibrosis following injury to these organs.

== See also ==
- Adamax
- BPC-157
- CJC-1295
- KPV tripeptide
- TB-500
