= MOTS-c =

Peptide encoded in mitochondrial DNA

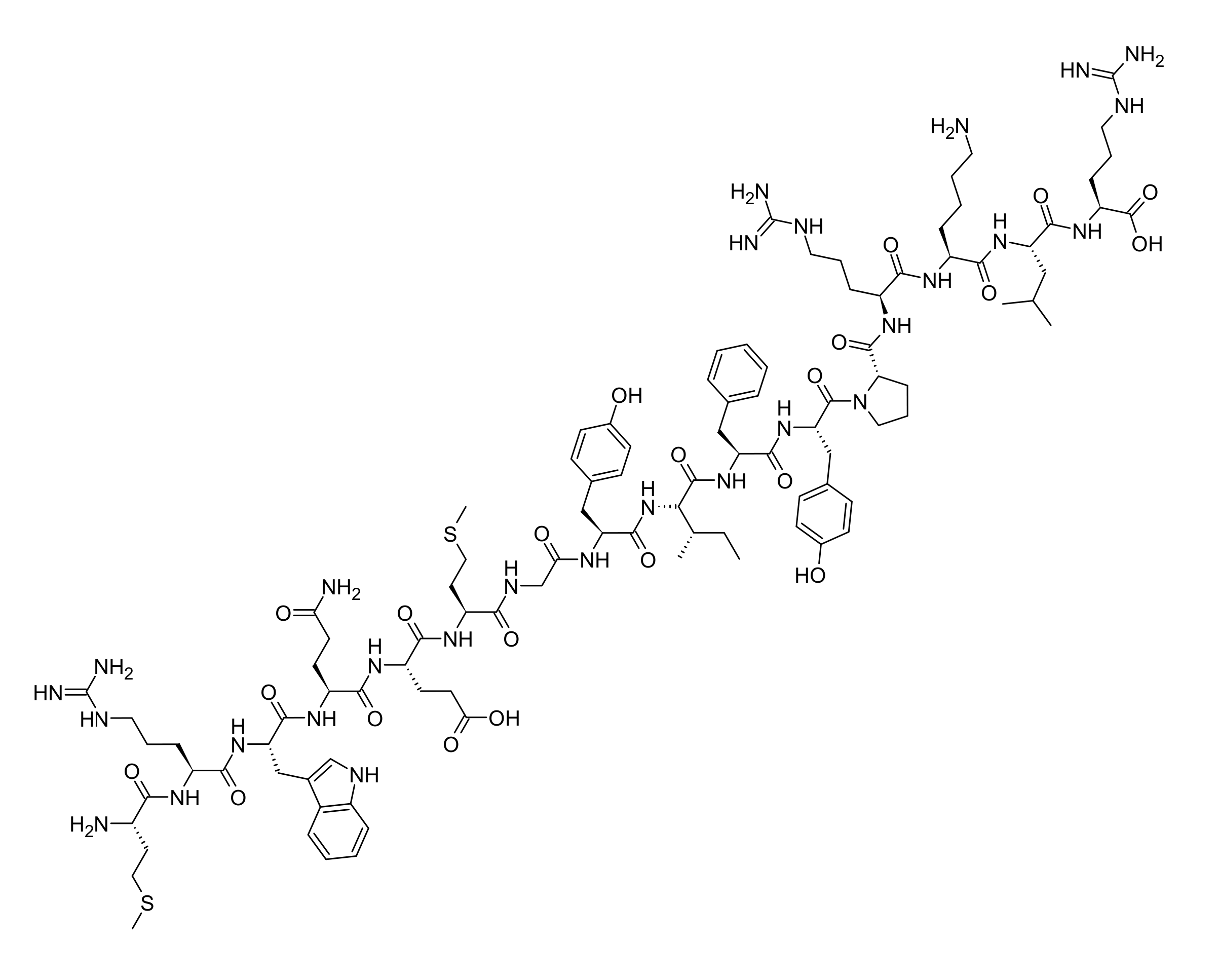

Identifiers
- IUPAC name: (4S)-4-[[(2S)-5-amino-2-[[(2S)-2-[[(2S)-2-[[(2S)-2-amino-4-methylsulfanylbutanoyl]amino]-5-carbamimidamidopentanoyl]amino]-3-(1H-indol-3-yl)propanoyl]amino]-5-oxopentanoyl]amino]-5-[[(2S)-1-[[2-[[(2S)-1-[[(2S,3S)-1-[[(2S)-1-[[(2S)-1-[(2S)-2-[[(2S)-1-[[(2S)-6-amino-1-[[(2S)-1-[[(1S)-4-carbamimidamido-1-carboxybutyl]amino]-4-methyl-1-oxopentan-2-yl]amino]-1-oxohexan-2-yl]amino]-5-carbamimidamido-1-oxopentan-2-yl]carbamoyl]pyrrolidin-1-yl]-3-(4-hydroxyphenyl)-1-oxopropan-2-yl]amino]-1-oxo-3-phenylpropan-2-yl]amino]-3-methyl-1-oxopentan-2-yl]amino]-3-(4-hydroxyphenyl)-1-oxopropan-2-yl]amino]-2-oxoethyl]amino]-4-methylsulfanyl-1-oxobutan-2-yl]amino]-5-oxopentanoic acid
- CAS Number: 1627580-64-6
- PubChem CID: 146675088
- UNII: A5CV6JFB78

Chemical and physical data
- Formula: C_{101}H_{152}N_{28}O_{22}S_{2}
- Molar mass: 2174.62 g·mol^{−1}
- 3D model (JSmol): Interactive image
- SMILES: CC[C@H](C)[C@@H](C(=O)N[C@@H](CC1=CC=CC=C1)C(=O)N[C@@H](CC2=CC=C(C=C2)O)C(=O)N3CCC[C@H]3C(=O)N[C@@H](CCCNC(=N)N)C(=O)N[C@@H](CCCCN)C(=O)N[C@@H](CC(C)C)C(=O)N[C@@H](CCCNC(=N)N)C(=O)O)NC(=O)[C@H](CC4=CC=C(C=C4)O)NC(=O)CNC(=O)[C@H](CCSC)NC(=O)[C@H](CCC(=O)O)NC(=O)[C@H](CCC(=O)N)NC(=O)[C@H](CC5=CNC6=CC=CC=C65)NC(=O)[C@H](CCCNC(=N)N)NC(=O)[C@H](CCSC)N
- InChI: InChI=1S/C101H152N28O22S2/c1-7-57(4)83(96(148)126-76(50-58-19-9-8-10-20-58)92(144)127-78(52-60-30-34-63(131)35-31-60)97(149)129-46-18-27-79(129)95(147)122-69(25-16-44-112-100(107)108)86(138)118-67(23-13-14-42-102)87(139)124-74(49-56(2)3)91(143)123-73(98(150)151)26-17-45-113-101(109)110)128-94(146)75(51-59-28-32-62(130)33-29-59)116-81(133)55-115-85(137)72(41-48-153-6)121-90(142)71(37-39-82(134)135)119-89(141)70(36-38-80(104)132)120-93(145)77(53-61-54-114-66-22-12-11-21-64(61)66)125-88(140)68(24-15-43-111-99(105)106)117-84(136)65(103)40-47-152-5/h8-12,19-22,28-35,54,56-57,65,67-79,83,114,130-131H,7,13-18,23-27,36-53,55,102-103H2,1-6H3,(H2,104,132)(H,115,137)(H,116,133)(H,117,136)(H,118,138)(H,119,141)(H,120,145)(H,121,142)(H,122,147)(H,123,143)(H,124,139)(H,125,140)(H,126,148)(H,127,144)(H,128,146)(H,134,135)(H,150,151)(H4,105,106,111)(H4,107,108,112)(H4,109,110,113)/t57-,65-,67-,68-,69-,70-,71-,72-,73-,74-,75-,76-,77-,78-,79-,83-/m0/s1; Key:WYTHCOXVWRKRAH-LOKRTKBUSA-N

MOTS-c (mitochondrial open reading frame of the 12S rRNA-c) is a 16-amino-acid peptide that in humans is encoded by the mitochondrial MT-RNR1 gene, with the amino acid sequence MRWQEMGYIFYPRKLR. It is believed to be involved in regulating metabolism of glucose by skeletal muscle tissue. It is upregulated in response to exercise, and is considered an exercise mimetic, as well as having other potential medical applications.

MOTS-c binds to casein kinase 2.

== Society and culture ==
A team of researchers led by Changhan Lee, a member of the Pinchas Cohen laboratory at the USC Davis School of Gerontology, discovered MOTS-c in 2015. Subsequent research by Lee and colleagues linked administration of MOTS-c to improved physical fitness, decreased obesity, and longer healthy lifespans in mice.

MOTS-c is not approved to treat any medical condition and is banned by the World Anti-Doping Agency, explicitly beginning in 2024. Despite a lack of robust human data, usage as an injectable supplement as part of the "peptide stacking" trend has been reported.

== See also ==
- Adipotide
- CJC-1295
- BPC-157
- Epidermal growth factor
- Humanin
- Mechano growth factor
- Small humanin-like peptide
- TB-500
