= Link-N =

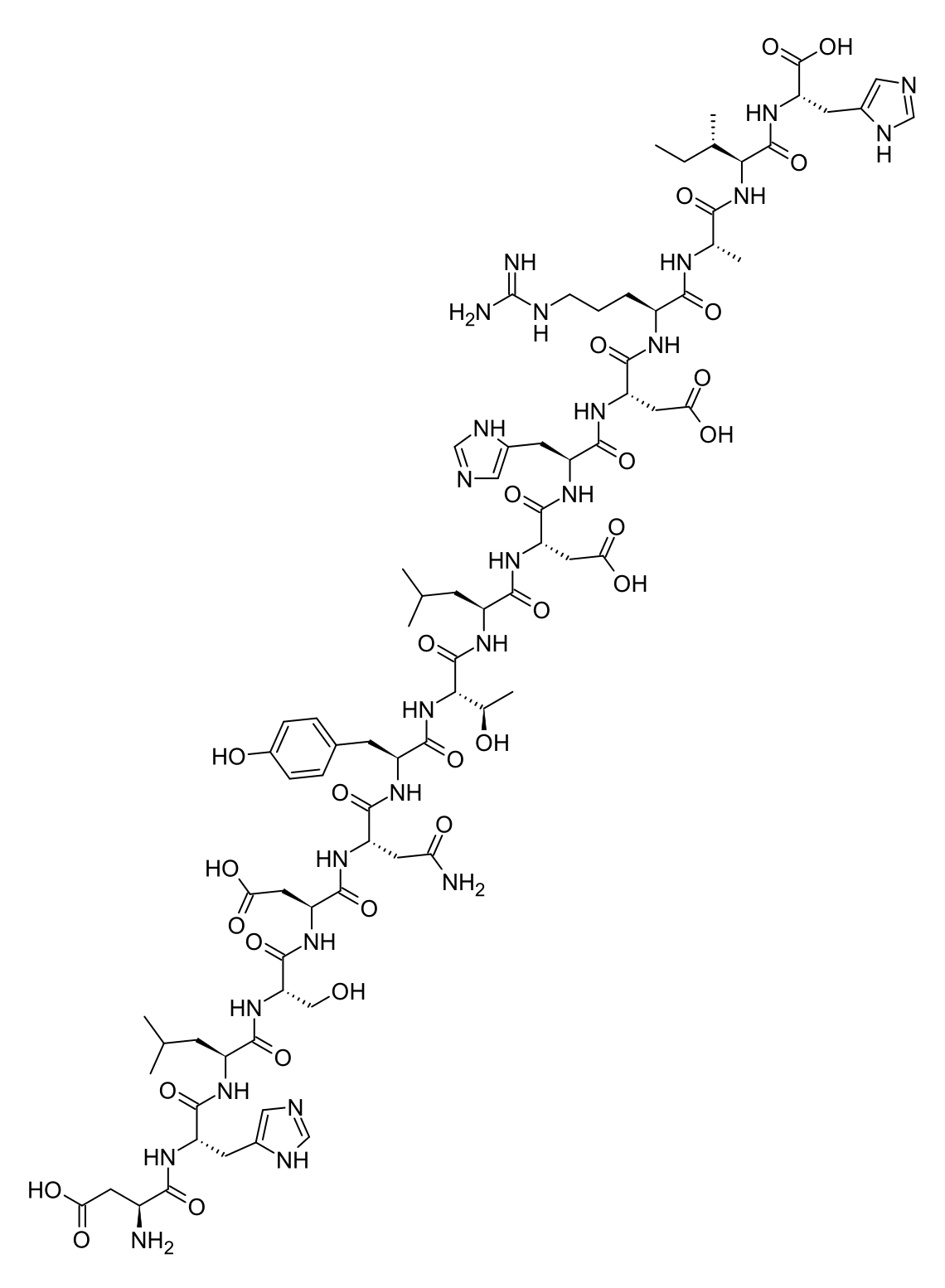

Identifiers
- IUPAC name: (3S)-3-amino-4-[[(2S)-1-[[(2S)-1-[[(2S)-1-[[(2S)-1-[[(2S)-4-amino-1-[[(2S)-1-[[(2S,3R)-1-[[(2S)-1-[[(2S)-1-[[(2S)-1-[[(2S)-1-[[(2S)-5-carbamimidamido-1-[[(2S)-1-[[(2S,3S)-1-[[(1S)-1-carboxy-2-(1H-imidazol-5-yl)ethyl]amino]-3-methyl-1-oxopentan-2-yl]amino]-1-oxopropan-2-yl]amino]-1-oxopentan-2-yl]amino]-3-carboxy-1-oxopropan-2-yl]amino]-3-(1H-imidazol-5-yl)-1-oxopropan-2-yl]amino]-3-carboxy-1-oxopropan-2-yl]amino]-4-methyl-1-oxopentan-2-yl]amino]-3-hydroxy-1-oxobutan-2-yl]amino]-3-(4-hydroxyphenyl)-1-oxopropan-2-yl]amino]-1,4-dioxobutan-2-yl]amino]-3-carboxy-1-oxopropan-2-yl]amino]-3-hydroxy-1-oxopropan-2-yl]amino]-4-methyl-1-oxopentan-2-yl]amino]-3-(1H-imidazol-5-yl)-1-oxopropan-2-yl]amino]-4-oxobutanoic acid
- CAS Number: 197295-74-2
- PubChem CID: 175678601
- ChemSpider: 129980411

Chemical and physical data
- Formula: C_{81}H_{120}N_{26}O_{29}
- Molar mass: 1922.004 g·mol^{−1}
- 3D model (JSmol): Interactive image
- SMILES: CC[C@H](C)[C@@H](C(=O)N[C@@H](CC1=CN=CN1)C(=O)O)NC(=O)[C@H](C)NC(=O)[C@H](CCCNC(=N)N)NC(=O)[C@H](CC(=O)O)NC(=O)[C@H](CC2=CN=CN2)NC(=O)[C@H](CC(=O)O)NC(=O)[C@H](CC(C)C)NC(=O)[C@H]([C@@H](C)O)NC(=O)[C@H](CC3=CC=C(C=C3)O)NC(=O)[C@H](CC(=O)N)NC(=O)[C@H](CC(=O)O)NC(=O)[C@H](CO)NC(=O)[C@H](CC(C)C)NC(=O)[C@H](CC4=CN=CN4)NC(=O)[C@H](CC(=O)O)N
- InChI: InChI=1S/C81H120N26O29/c1-9-37(6)63(78(133)104-56(80(135)136)22-43-30-88-34-92-43)106-65(120)38(7)93-67(122)46(11-10-16-89-81(84)85)94-73(128)53(25-60(114)115)101-71(126)51(21-42-29-87-33-91-42)98-74(129)54(26-61(116)117)100-68(123)48(18-36(4)5)103-79(134)64(39(8)109)107-76(131)49(19-40-12-14-44(110)15-13-40)97-72(127)52(24-58(83)111)99-75(130)55(27-62(118)119)102-77(132)57(31-108)105-69(124)47(17-35(2)3)96-70(125)50(20-41-28-86-32-90-41)95-66(121)45(82)23-59(112)113/h12-15,28-30,32-39,45-57,63-64,108-110H,9-11,16-27,31,82H2,1-8H3,(H2,83,111)(H,86,90)(H,87,91)(H,88,92)(H,93,122)(H,94,128)(H,95,121)(H,96,125)(H,97,127)(H,98,129)(H,99,130)(H,100,123)(H,101,126)(H,102,132)(H,103,134)(H,104,133)(H,105,124)(H,106,120)(H,107,131)(H,112,113)(H,114,115)(H,116,117)(H,118,119)(H,135,136)(H4,84,85,89)/t37-,38-,39+,45-,46-,47-,48-,49-,50-,51-,52-,53-,54-,55-,56-,57-,63-,64-/m0/s1; Key:GHPHCEQEWSDUET-MMXWBEGUSA-N

Link-N (DHLSDNYTLDHDRAIH) is a naturally occurring 16-amino acid peptide which is the N-terminal fragment derived from enzymatic cleavage of cartilage link protein.

It has antiinflammatory effects and stimulates cartilage regrowth in both in vitro cultures of human cartilage tissue and animal models of arthritis, but is not known to have been tested in humans.

== See also ==
- B7-33
- BPC-157
- Cartalax
- Mechano growth factor
- PEPITEM
- TB-500
- Teriparatide
- Tertomotide
