= B7-33 =

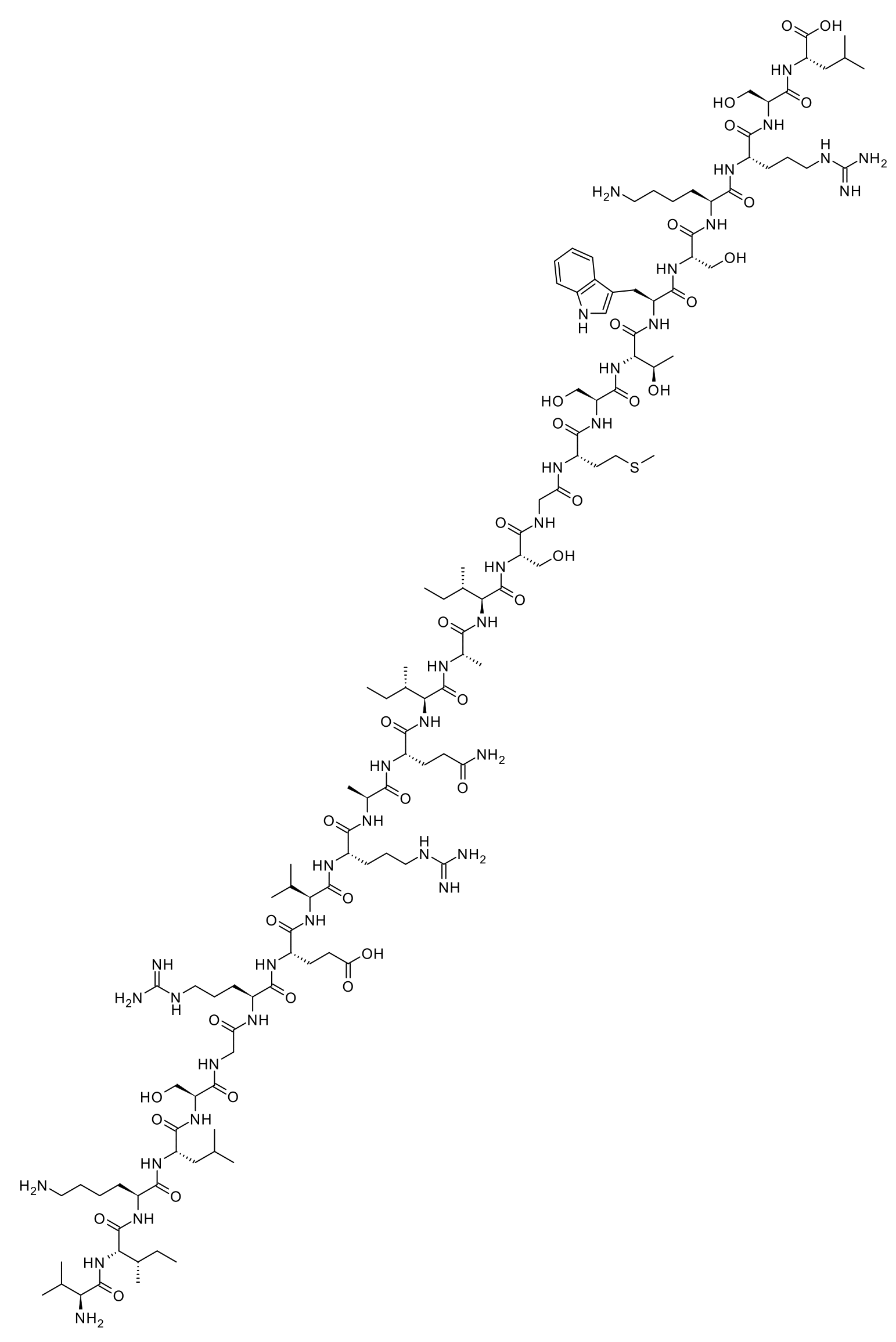

Identifiers
- IUPAC name: (4S)-5-[[(2S)-1-[[(2S)-1-[[(2S)-1-[[(2S)-1-[[(2S)-5-amino-1-[[(2S,3S)-1-[[(2S)-1-[[(2S,3S)-1-[[(2S)-1-[[2-[[(2S)-1-[[(2S)-1-[[(2S,3R)-1-[[(2S)-1-[[(2S)-1-[[(2S)-6-amino-1-[[(2S)-1-[[(2S)-1-[[(2S)-1-amino-4-methyl-1-oxopentan-2-yl]amino]-3-hydroxy-1-oxopropan-2-yl]amino]-5-carbamimidamido-1-oxopentan-2-yl]amino]-1-oxohexan-2-yl]amino]-3-hydroxy-1-oxopropan-2-yl]amino]-3-(1H-indol-3-yl)-1-oxopropan-2-yl]amino]-3-hydroxy-1-oxobutan-2-yl]amino]-3-hydroxy-1-oxopropan-2-yl]amino]-4-methylsulfanyl-1-oxobutan-2-yl]amino]-2-oxoethyl]amino]-3-hydroxy-1-oxopropan-2-yl]amino]-3-methyl-1-oxopentan-2-yl]amino]-1-oxopropan-2-yl]amino]-3-methyl-1-oxopentan-2-yl]amino]-1,5-dioxopentan-2-yl]amino]-1-oxopropan-2-yl]amino]-5-carbamimidamido-1-oxopentan-2-yl]amino]-3-methyl-1-oxobutan-2-yl]amino]-4-methyl-1-oxopentan-2-yl]amino]-4-[[(2S)-2-[[2-[[(2S)-2-[[(2S)-2-[[(2S)-6-amino-2-[[(2S,3S)-2-[[(2S)-2-amino-3-methylbutanoyl]amino]-3-methylpentanoyl]amino]hexanoyl]amino]-4-methylpentanoyl]amino]-3-hydroxypropanoyl]amino]acetyl]amino]-5-carbamimidamidopentanoyl]amino]-5-oxopentanoic acid
- CAS Number: 1818415-56-3
- PubChem CID: 162662592
- ChemSpider: 129524084
- ChEMBL: ChEMBL4780098

Chemical and physical data
- Formula: C_{131}H_{229}N_{41}O_{36}S
- Molar mass: 2986.58 g·mol^{−1}
- 3D model (JSmol): Interactive image
- SMILES: CC[C@H](C)[C@@H](C(=O)N[C@@H](CO)C(=O)NCC(=O)N[C@@H](CCSC)C(=O)N[C@@H](CO)C(=O)N[C@@H]([C@@H](C)O)C(=O)N[C@@H](CC1=CNC2=CC=CC=C21)C(=O)N[C@@H](CO)C(=O)N[C@@H](CCCCN)C(=O)N[C@@H](CCCNC(=N)N)C(=O)N[C@@H](CO)C(=O)N[C@@H](CC(C)C)C(=O)N)NC(=O)[C@H](C)NC(=O)[C@H]([C@@H](C)CC)NC(=O)[C@H](CCC(=O)N)NC(=O)[C@H](C)NC(=O)[C@H](CCCNC(=N)N)NC(=O)[C@H](C(C)C)NC(=O)[C@H](CC(C)C)NC(=O)[C@H](CCC(=O)O)NC(=O)[C@H](CCCNC(=N)N)NC(=O)CNC(=O)[C@H](CO)NC(=O)[C@H](CC(C)C)NC(=O)[C@H](CCCCN)NC(=O)[C@H]([C@@H](C)CC)NC(=O)[C@H](C(C)C)N
- InChI: InChI=1S/C131H229N41O36S/c1-21-68(14)100(125(205)150-72(18)106(186)169-101(69(15)22-2)127(207)167-90(59-174)108(188)148-57-96(181)152-84(44-50-209-20)115(195)165-93(62-177)122(202)172-103(73(19)178)128(208)162-88(54-74-55-146-76-34-25-24-33-75(74)76)118(198)166-91(60-175)120(200)155-78(35-26-28-45-132)111(191)154-81(39-32-49-145-131(141)142)113(193)164-92(61-176)121(201)159-85(104(136)184)51-63(4)5)170-116(196)82(40-42-94(134)179)153-105(185)71(17)149-109(189)80(38-31-48-144-130(139)140)157-124(204)99(67(12)13)168-119(199)87(53-65(8)9)161-114(194)83(41-43-97(182)183)156-110(190)77(37-30-47-143-129(137)138)151-95(180)56-147-107(187)89(58-173)163-117(197)86(52-64(6)7)160-112(192)79(36-27-29-46-133)158-126(206)102(70(16)23-3)171-123(203)98(135)66(10)11/h24-25,33-34,55,63-73,77-93,98-103,146,173-178H,21-23,26-32,35-54,56-62,132-133,135H2,1-20H3,(H2,134,179)(H2,136,184)(H,147,187)(H,148,188)(H,149,189)(H,150,205)(H,151,180)(H,152,181)(H,153,185)(H,154,191)(H,155,200)(H,156,190)(H,157,204)(H,158,206)(H,159,201)(H,160,192)(H,161,194)(H,162,208)(H,163,197)(H,164,193)(H,165,195)(H,166,198)(H,167,207)(H,168,199)(H,169,186)(H,170,196)(H,171,203)(H,172,202)(H,182,183)(H4,137,138,143)(H4,139,140,144)(H4,141,142,145)/t68-,69-,70-,71-,72-,73+,77-,78-,79-,80-,81-,82-,83-,84-,85-,86-,87-,88-,89-,90-,91-,92-,93-,98-,99-,100-,101-,102-,103-/m0/s1; Key:UAGASAJLEJWQIF-GARFIVTISA-N

B7-33 is a synthetic 26-amino acid peptide with the sequence VIKLSGRELVRAQIAISGMSTWSKRSL or Val-Ile-Lys-Leu-Ser-Gly-Arg-Glu-Leu-Val-Arg-Ala-Gln-Ile-Ala-Ile-Ser-Gly-Met-Ser-Thr-Trp-Ser-Lys-Arg-Ser-Leu. It is an N-terminal truncated, C-terminal extended fragment from the B chain of human relaxin-2, and has similar anti-fibrotic effects to the full length peptide. It has been researched for conditions where excess fibrosis plays a role, such as cardiac fibrosis and pulmonary fibrosis.

== See also ==
- Cartalax
- Link-N
