= BPC-157 =

Peptide

Clinical data
- Routes of administration: IM, IV, IP (in animals), oral, subQ
- Drug class: peptide

Legal status
- Legal status: Not marketed

Pharmacokinetic data
- Elimination half-life: 7.9–30 minutes (rat, IV and IM)

Identifiers
- CAS Number: 137525-51-0
- PubChem CID: 9941957
- DrugBank: DB11882
- ChemSpider: 8117571
- UNII: 8ED8NXK95P
- ChEMBL: ChEMBL4297358

Chemical and physical data
- Formula: C_{62}H_{98}N_{16}O_{22}
- Molar mass: 1419.556 g·mol^{−1}
- 3D model (JSmol): Interactive image
- SMILES: C[C@@H](C(=O)N[C@@H](CC(=O)O)C(=O)N[C@@H](CC(=O)O)C(=O)N[C@@H](C)C(=O)NCC(=O)N[C@@H](CC(C)C)C(=O)N[C@@H](C(C)C)C(=O)O)NC(=O)[C@@H]1CCCN1C(=O)[C@H](CCCCN)NC(=O)CNC(=O)[C@@H]2CCCN2C(=O)[C@@H]3CCCN3C(=O)[C@@H]4CCCN4C(=O)[C@H](CCC(=O)O)NC(=O)CN
- InChI: InChI=1S/C62H98N16O22/c1-31(2)25-37(55(92)74-50(32(3)4)62(99)100)71-46(81)29-65-51(88)33(5)67-53(90)38(26-48(84)85)73-54(91)39(27-49(86)87)72-52(89)34(6)68-57(94)41-15-10-21-75(41)58(95)35(13-7-8-20-63)70-45(80)30-66-56(93)40-14-9-22-76(40)60(97)43-17-12-24-78(43)61(98)42-16-11-23-77(42)59(96)36(18-19-47(82)83)69-44(79)28-64/h31-43,50H,7-30,63-64H2,1-6H3,(H,65,88)(H,66,93)(H,67,90)(H,68,94)(H,69,79)(H,70,80)(H,71,81)(H,72,89)(H,73,91)(H,74,92)(H,82,83)(H,84,85)(H,86,87)(H,99,100)/t33-,34-,35-,36-,37-,38-,39-,40-,41-,42-,43-,50-/m0/s1; Key:HEEWEZGQMLZMFE-RKGINYAYSA-N

Gastric pentadecapeptide BPC-157 (also known as Body Protection Compound 157, bepecin, or PL 14736) is a synthetic fifteen amino acid oligopeptide derived from a protein found in human gastric juice. BPC-157 has been studied primarily in laboratory animals. BPC-157 is not approved by any drug regulatory agency for human use, and there is limited data regarding its effectiveness on humans. On 30 October 2026, US Health Secretary Robert F. Kennedy Jr. announced that BPC-157 along with several other commonly used peptides TB-500, epitalon, KPV, MOTS-c and semax would be permitted to be supplied by compounding pharmacies for human use, despite not being approved by the FDA.

The peptide has gained popularity among athletes and the general public for injury recovery, leading the World Anti-Doping Agency to ban it in 2022. Health authorities discourage its use due to insufficient human safety data, and some jurisdictions have restricted it as a prescription-only medicine despite it not being available through legitimate prescriptions. Additionally, because the compound promotes blood vessel formation (angiogenesis), it may promote cancer, or enlarge undetected cancers.

The peptide was discovered during research on human gastric juice. The amino acid sequence is Gly-Glu-Pro-Pro-Pro-Gly-Lys-Pro-Ala-Asp-Asp-Ala-Gly-Leu-Val. BPC-157 is stable at room temperature and bioavailable in rodent models when administered IM or IV. The peptide demonstrates unusual stability in human gastric juice, remaining intact for more than 24 hours.

== Research ==
BPC-157 was discovered by Predrag Sikirić, a now professor emeritus of pharmacology at the University of Zagreb School of Medicine in Croatia. He published about it in 1993 in the Journal of Physiology, Paris.

Pre-clinical research has indicated that BPC-157 may have cytoprotective, neuroprotective, and anti-inflammatory effects, and may also accelerate tissue and organ healing.

This substance is sometimes used in functional medicine despite not being approved by any drug regulatory agency. The compound promotes angiogenesis and as a result has some concerns over cancer promotion.

As of 2022, the peptide has been banned by the World Anti-Doping Agency under the S0 category of non-exempt substances.

BPC-157 has been widely used both by athletes and among the general public, mainly for recovery from injury or stimulating healing in chronic conditions, but there is as yet only very limited human trial data on efficacy and only a few preliminary safety studies. Human studies of BPC-157 remain scarce; a 2025 literature review identified limited clinical evidence, including a retrospective study of 12 patients with knee pain and a Phase I trial in healthy volunteers whose results were not submitted. Use of BPC-157 is discouraged by health authorities and it has been controlled as a prescription medicine in several jurisdictions such as New Zealand and Australia, despite not actually being available for prescription.

=== Detection ===
BPC-157 is detected in urine using a weak cation exchange solid phase extraction and was found to be stable in urine for 4 days.

== See also ==
- Ac-SDKP
- Adamax
- Cartalax
- CJC-1295
- GHK-Cu
- KPV tripeptide
- Link-N
- Mechano growth factor
- TB-500
