= Modified GRF (1-29) =

Amino acid-like chemical compound

Identifiers
- Symbol: Mod GRF (1-29)

Modified GRF (1-29) often abbreviated as mod GRF (1-29), originally known as tetrasubstituted GRF (1-29), is a term used to identify a 29 amino acid peptide analogue of growth-hormone-releasing hormone (GHRH), a releasing hormone of growth hormone (GH). It is a modified version of the shortest fully functional fragment of GHRH, often referred to as growth hormone releasing factor (1-29) (abbreviated as GRF (1-29)), and also known by its standardized name, sermorelin.

== Origin ==
The first 29 amino acids of GHRH were discovered to be as equally potent as its full 44 amino acid structure This fragment became known as GRF (1-29). However, due to a rapid metabolic clearance analogues of GRF (1-29) were synthesized to enhance the biological activity and reduce the rapidity of metabolic clearance. These analogues were primarily created by substituting amino acids within the peptide structure for amino acids more resistant to enzymatic cleavage. One early analogue substituted the amino acid L-alanine (abbreviated as Ala or A) at the 2nd position of the peptide structure for its optical isomer (mirror image), D-alanine (abbreviated as D-Ala). This substitution resulted in a peptide bond between D-Ala and the 3rd amino acid in the structure aspartic acid (Asp) more able to resist rapid cleavage by the enzyme dipeptidyl peptidase-4, a cleavage which had previously led to an inactive peptide fragment. This successful modification prompted the further creation of analogues with additional amino acid substitutions.

In 2005, the first specific mention of tetrasubstituted GRF (1-29) appeared in a study that used it as one of the GRF (1-29) analogue peptide structures studied. The term was used to describe the replacement of the 2nd, 8th, 15th, and 27th amino acids in the structure of GRF (1-29).

== Effect ==
Modified GRF (1-29) acts to increase growth hormone production and release by binding to the growth-hormone-releasing hormone receptor (GHRHR) on cells in the anterior pituitary.

== Structure ==
GRF (1-29), also known as sermorelin (Tyr-Ala-Asp-Ala-Ile-Phe-Thr-Asn-Ser-Tyr-Arg-Lys-Val-Leu-Gly-Gln-Leu-Ser-Ala-Arg-Lys-Leu-Leu-Gln-Asp-Ile-Met-Ser-Arg-NH_{2}), the biologically-active portion of the 44 amino acid GHRH. Half-life "less than 10 minutes", perhaps as low as 5 minutes.

Mod GRF (1-29) replacement of the 2nd, 8th, 15th, and 27th amino acids of GRF (1-29) yields modified GRF(1-29) (Tyr-D-Ala-Asp-Ala-Ile-Phe-Thr-Gln-Ser-Tyr-Arg-Lys-Val-Leu-Ala-Gln-Leu-Ser-Ala-Arg-Lys-Leu-Leu-Gln-Asp-Ile-Leu-Ser-Arg-NH_{2}). Half-life at least 30 minutes.

== See also ==
- List of growth hormone secretagogues
