= Peptide 021 =

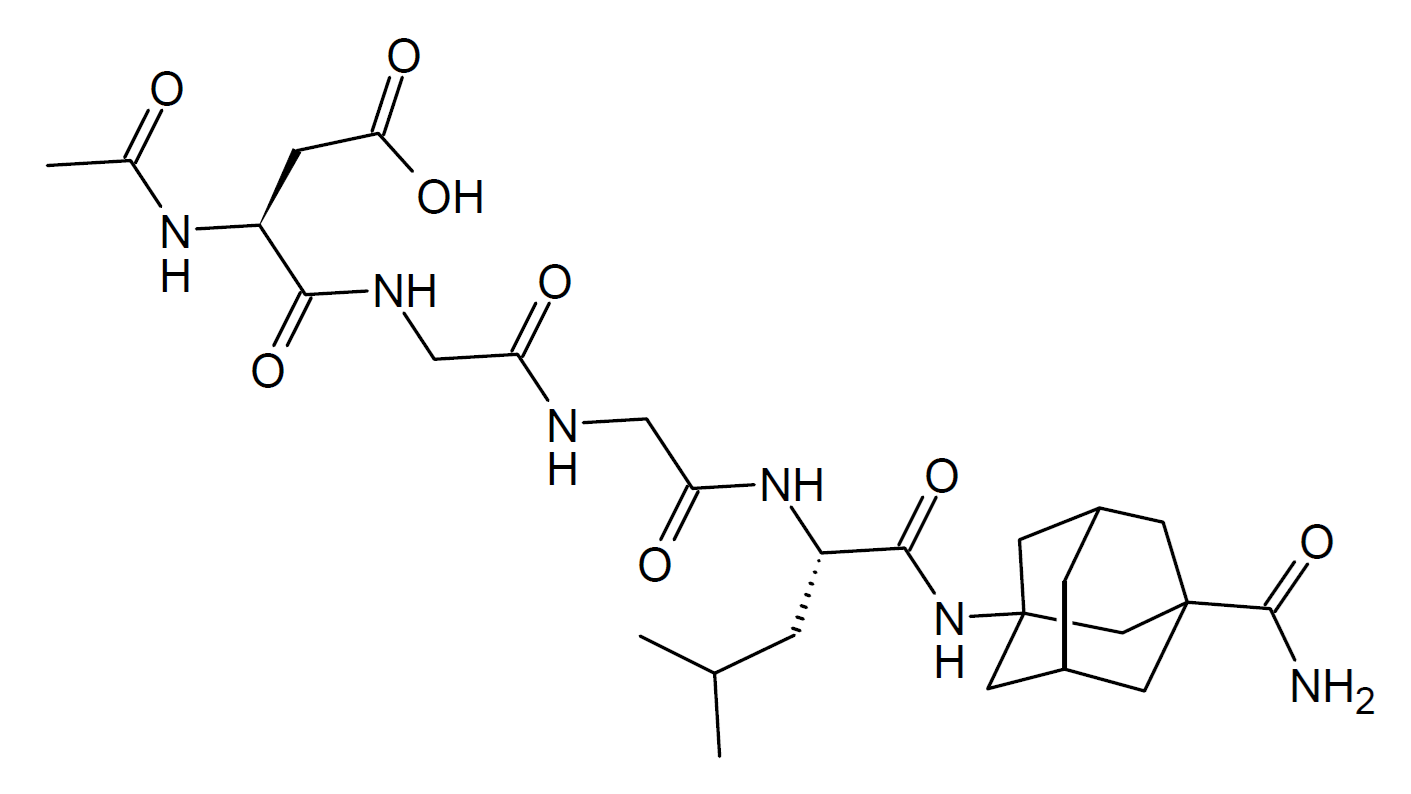

Identifiers
- IUPAC name: (3S)-3-acetamido-4-[[2-[[2-[[(2S)-1-[[(5S,7R)-3-carbamoyl-1-adamantyl]amino]-4-methyl-1-oxopentan-2-yl]amino]-2-oxoethyl]amino]-2-oxoethyl]amino]-4-oxobutanoic acid
- CAS Number: 1246751-68-7
- PubChem CID: 56589645
- UNII: VV8CZC8PAS

Chemical and physical data
- Formula: C_{27}H_{42}N_{6}O_{8}
- Molar mass: 578.667 g·mol^{−1}
- 3D model (JSmol): Interactive image
- SMILES: CC(C)C[C@@H](C(=O)NC12C[C@@H]3C[C@H](C1)CC(C3)(C2)C(=O)N)NC(=O)CNC(=O)CNC(=O)[C@H](CC(=O)O)NC(=O)C
- InChI: InChI=1S/C27H42N6O8/c1-14(2)4-18(24(40)33-27-9-16-5-17(10-27)8-26(7-16,13-27)25(28)41)32-21(36)12-29-20(35)11-30-23(39)19(6-22(37)38)31-15(3)34/h14,16-19H,4-13H2,1-3H3,(H2,28,41)(H,29,35)(H,30,39)(H,31,34)(H,32,36)(H,33,40)(H,37,38)/t16-,17+,18-,19-,26?,27?/m0/s1; Key:LUJZBZPLIRWWGJ-NBONATBJSA-N

Peptide 021 (Ac-DGGL^{A}G-NH2, P021, GLXC-21260) is a synthetic peptide derivative that is derived from a 4-amino acid active fragment of ciliary neurotrophic factor, which has been substituted with an unnatural adamantane based amino acid residue on the end of the chain. This substitution is highly lipophilic and facilitates transport of the molecule across the blood-brain barrier. It has neurotrophic effects and enhances neurogenesis, and has been investigated for treatment of neurological disorders such as Alzheimer's disease.

== See also ==
- Adamax
