= ConjuChem =

Canadian biotechnology company

ConjuChem Biotechnologies Inc.
- Company type: Public (TSX has Delisted this Stock)
- Industry: Biotechnology
- Headquarters: Montreal, Quebec, Canada
- Key people: Mark Perrin
- Products: Drug Affinity Construct (DAC) and Preformed Conjugate-Drug Affinity Construct (PC-DAC)
- Number of employees: 44
- Website: www.conjuchem.com

ConjuChem Biotechnologies Inc. is a medical biotechnology company located in Montreal, Quebec, Canada which is credited with inventing the experimental peptide hormone CJC-1295.

It employs 45 people, 90% of whom are in research and development.
