= Small humanin-like peptide =

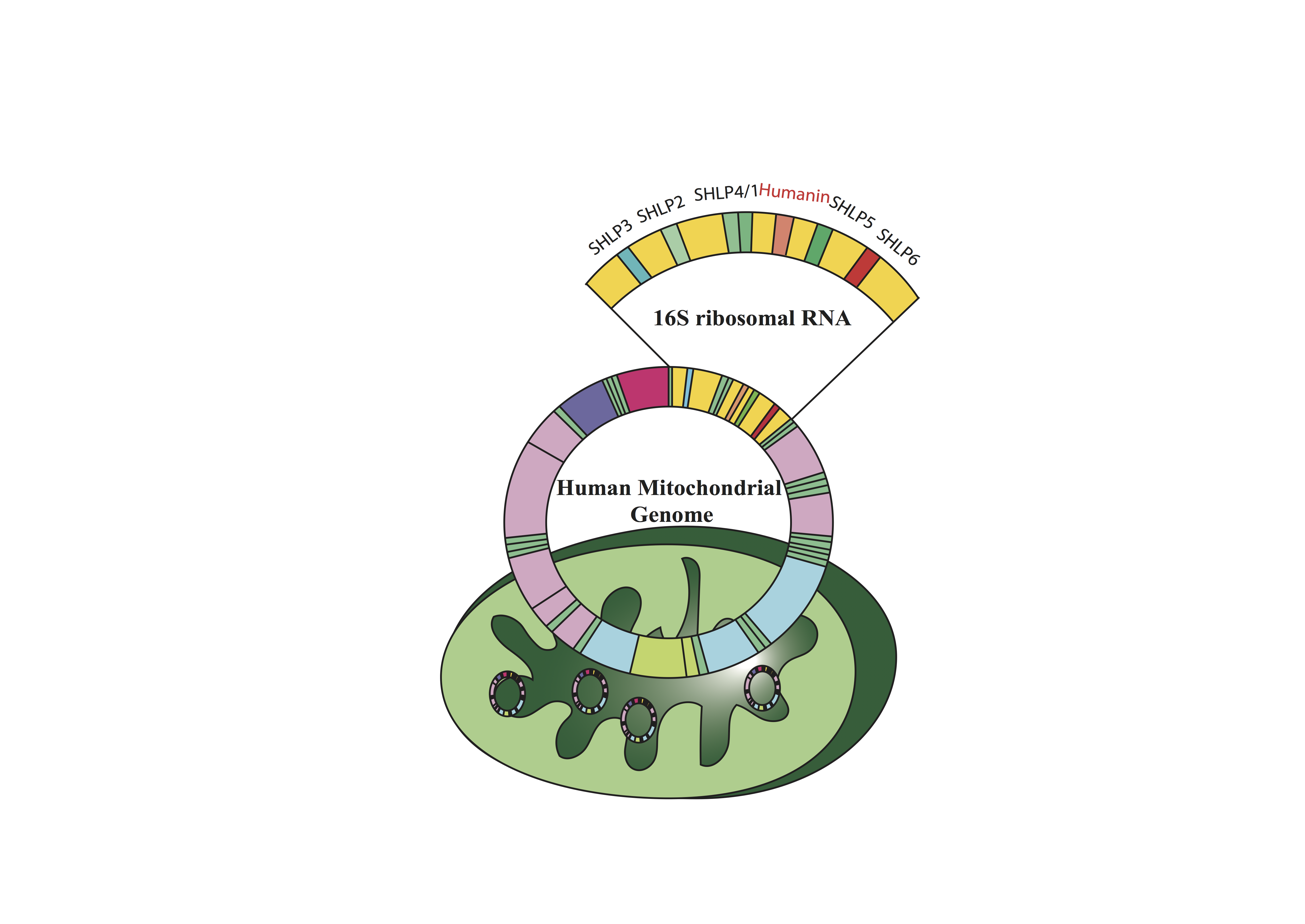
Locations of SHLPs in the mitochondrial genome

Small humanin-like peptides (SHLPs) are a group of peptides encoded in the 16S ribosomal RNA region of mitochondrial genome. Six peptides of this group (SHLP1–6) have been identified so far, between 20-38 amino acids in length. They are derived from the mitochondria and act as important retrograde signaling molecules in the cell. Their names were given because the SHLPs share some similar biological effects with the mitochondrial peptide Humanin.

Every individual SHLP showed unique expression pattern in mouse tissues. Specifically, SHLP1 was detected in the heart, kidney, and spleen; SHLP2 was detected in the liver, kidney, and muscle; SHLP3 was detected in the brain and spleen; SHLP4 was detected in the liver and prostate; and SHLP6 was detected in the liver and kidney.

Experiments using cultured mammalian cells have shown that SHLPs are bioactive peptides. Incubation of each synthetic SHLP with cells affected cell viability, proliferation and apoptosis differentially, which suggests that every SHLP may play a different role in the biological system.

== Discovery ==
An in silico search for potential small open-reading-frames (sORFs) within 16S ribosomal RNA-encoding short peptides (20–40 amino acids) was conducted in the Pinchas Cohen lab at University of Southern California. Six sequences encoding 20–38 amino-acid-long peptides were identified, which were named SHLP 1–6. The endogenous SHLPs were detected by immunoblots and their transcripts were validated by both qPCR and northern blot.

== Structure ==
All SHLPs, like humanin, are encoded in the mitochondrial 16S RNA gene (MT-RNR2). The human sequences are:

HN MAPRGESCLLLLTSEIDLPVKRRA
S1 MCHWAGGASNTGDARGDVFGKQAG
S2 MGVKFFTLSTREFPSVQRAVPLWTNS
S3 MLGYNFSSFPCGTISIAPGENFYRLYFIWVNGLAKVVW
S4 MLEVMELVNRRGKICRVPETFFNLSL
S5 MYCSEVGFCSEVAPTEIFNAGLWV
S6 MLDQDIPMVQPLLKVRLEND

Note that no formal HUGO gene symbols have been assigned to any of the SHLPs. They are not to be confused with the Shelphs, which are sometimes abbreviated SHLP in their gene symbol.

== Functions ==
Individual SHLPs demonstrated different biological effects. SHLP2 and SHLP3 enhanced cell viability and inhibited apoptosis in both NIT-1 and 22Rv1 cells. SHLP2 and SHLP4 promoted cell proliferation in NIT-1 β-cells. SHLP6 significantly increased apoptosis in both NIT-1 and 22Rv1 cells, having an effect opposite of SHLP2 and SHLP3. Moreover, SHLP2 and SHLP3 also induced oxygen consumption rate (OCR) and increased cellular ATP levels, which indicates that SHLP2 and 3 are mitochondrial modulators.

Analysis of SHLP and humanin homologs across all vertebrates show that humanin and SHLP6 are well-conserved and subject to natural selection, suggesting that they have a biological function. SHLP4 is conserved but does not appear to be under selection.

== See also ==
- MOTS-c
