= Mechano growth factor =

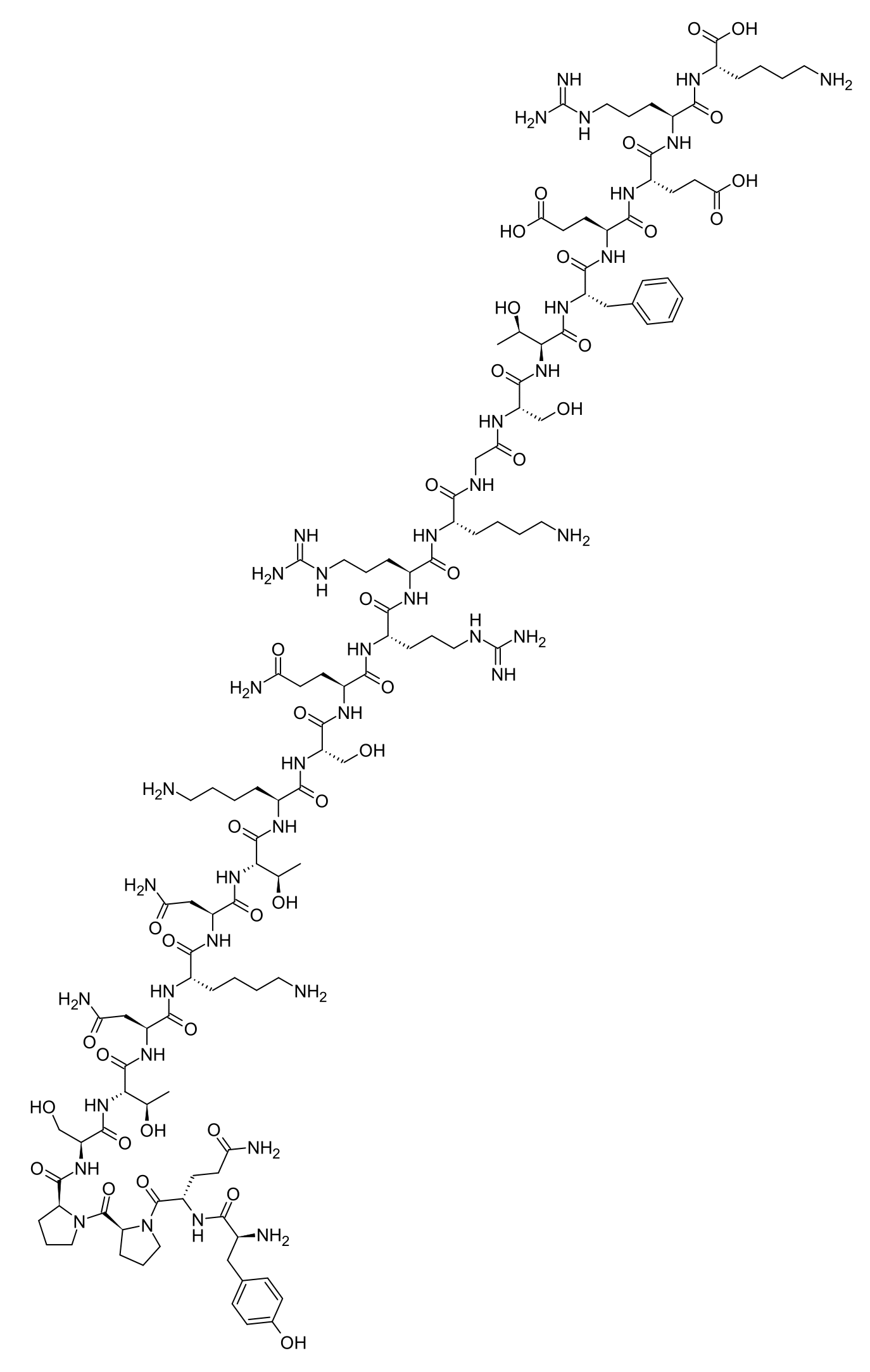

Identifiers
- IUPAC name: (2S)-6-amino-2-[[(2S)-2-[[(2S)-2-[[(2S)-2-[[(2S)-2-[[(2S,3R)-2-[[(2S)-2-[[2-[[(2S)-6-amino-2-[[(2S)-2-[[(2S)-2-[[(2S)-5-amino-2-[[(2S)-2-[[(2S)-6-amino-2-[[(2S,3R)-2-[[(2S)-4-amino-2-[[(2S)-6-amino-2-[[(2S)-4-amino-2-[[(2S,3R)-2-[[(2S)-2-[[(2S)-1-[(2S)-1-[(2S)-5-amino-2-[[(2S)-2-amino-3-(4-hydroxyphenyl)propanoyl]amino]-5-oxopentanoyl]pyrrolidine-2-carbonyl]pyrrolidine-2-carbonyl]amino]-3-hydroxypropanoyl]amino]-3-hydroxybutanoyl]amino]-4-oxobutanoyl]amino]hexanoyl]amino]-4-oxobutanoyl]amino]-3-hydroxybutanoyl]amino]hexanoyl]amino]-3-hydroxypropanoyl]amino]-5-oxopentanoyl]amino]-5-carbamimidamidopentanoyl]amino]-5-carbamimidamidopentanoyl]amino]hexanoyl]amino]acetyl]amino]-3-hydroxypropanoyl]amino]-3-hydroxybutanoyl]amino]-3-phenylpropanoyl]amino]-4-carboxybutanoyl]amino]-4-carboxybutanoyl]amino]-5-carbamimidamidopentanoyl]amino]hexanoic acid
- PubChem CID: 175675731

Chemical and physical data
- Formula: C_{121}H_{199}N_{41}O_{40}
- Molar mass: 2868.170 g·mol^{−1}
- 3D model (JSmol): Interactive image
- SMILES: C[C@H]([C@@H](C(=O)N[C@@H](CCCCN)C(=O)N[C@@H](CO)C(=O)N[C@@H](CCC(=O)N)C(=O)N[C@@H](CCCNC(=N)N)C(=O)N[C@@H](CCCNC(=N)N)C(=O)N[C@@H](CCCCN)C(=O)NCC(=O)N[C@@H](CO)C(=O)N[C@@H]([C@@H](C)O)C(=O)N[C@@H](CC1=CC=CC=C1)C(=O)N[C@@H](CCC(=O)O)C(=O)N[C@@H](CCC(=O)O)C(=O)N[C@@H](CCCNC(=N)N)C(=O)N[C@@H](CCCCN)C(=O)O)NC(=O)[C@H](CC(=O)N)NC(=O)[C@H](CCCCN)NC(=O)[C@H](CC(=O)N)NC(=O)[C@H]([C@@H](C)O)NC(=O)[C@H](CO)NC(=O)[C@@H]2CCCN2C(=O)[C@@H]3CCCN3C(=O)[C@H](CCC(=O)N)NC(=O)[C@H](CC4=CC=C(C=C4)O)N)O
- InChI: InChI=1S/C121H199N41O40/c1-60(166)93(158-108(191)80(55-89(130)173)153-101(184)68(23-8-12-44-123)146-107(190)79(54-88(129)172)155-115(198)95(62(3)168)160-111(194)83(59-165)157-112(195)84-29-18-50-161(84)117(200)85-30-19-51-162(85)116(199)76(36-40-87(128)171)151-96(179)66(126)52-64-31-33-65(169)34-32-64)113(196)150-69(24-9-13-45-124)102(185)156-82(58-164)109(192)149-73(35-39-86(127)170)103(186)144-71(27-16-48-138-120(133)134)99(182)143-70(26-15-47-137-119(131)132)98(181)142-67(22-7-11-43-122)97(180)140-56-90(174)141-81(57-163)110(193)159-94(61(2)167)114(197)154-78(53-63-20-5-4-6-21-63)106(189)148-75(38-42-92(177)178)105(188)147-74(37-41-91(175)176)104(187)145-72(28-17-49-139-121(135)136)100(183)152-77(118(201)202)25-10-14-46-125/h4-6,20-21,31-34,60-62,66-85,93-95,163-169H,7-19,22-30,35-59,122-126H2,1-3H3,(H2,127,170)(H2,128,171)(H2,129,172)(H2,130,173)(H,140,180)(H,141,174)(H,142,181)(H,143,182)(H,144,186)(H,145,187)(H,146,190)(H,147,188)(H,148,189)(H,149,192)(H,150,196)(H,151,179)(H,152,183)(H,153,184)(H,154,197)(H,155,198)(H,156,185)(H,157,195)(H,158,191)(H,159,193)(H,160,194)(H,175,176)(H,177,178)(H,201,202)(H4,131,132,137)(H4,133,134,138)(H4,135,136,139)/t60-,61-,62-,66+,67+,68+,69+,70+,71+,72+,73+,74+,75+,76+,77+,78+,79+,80+,81+,82+,83+,84+,85+,93+,94+,95+/m1/s1; Key:TXMSCWQMYNJNDC-XGJLPCLZSA-N

Mechano growth factor (MGF, IGF-IEc) is a naturally occurring 24-amino acid peptide which is the C-terminal fragment derived from enzymatic cleavage of insulin-like growth factor 1 (IGF-1). It is expressed during muscle repair following physical activity, and has anabolic effects. This has led to illicit use by athletes leading to MGF being banned by the World Anti-Doping Association.

At least one research paper raised concerns about the potential carcinogenicity of this compound.

== Structure and variations ==
The amino acid sequence is reasonably highly conserved among mammalian species, with the native human sequence being YQPPSTNKNTKSQRRKGSTFEERK or Tyr‑Gln‑Pro‑Pro‑Ser‑Thr‑Asn‑Lys‑Asn‑Thr‑Lys‑Ser‑Gln‑Arg‑Arg‑Lys‑Gly‑Ser‑Thr‑Phe‑Glu‑Glu‑Arg‑Lys. However, there are also several other splice variants of IGF-1 aside from MGF. Multiple forms of MGF are used in scientific research such as the native mouse or rat form which have several amino acid changes, or a consensus sequence mainly based on the human sequence but with the arginine changed to histidine at position 23 and sometimes other substitutions, to more closely resemble the rodent version. Since mechano growth factor is rapidly metabolised in vivo, synthetic versions often use two or more unnatural D-amino acids in the central "QRRK" domain at positions 13-16 to improve metabolic stability, the tyrosine residue may also be PEGylated in these peptides.

== See also ==
- GHK-Cu
- BPC-157
- Elamipretide
- Epidermal growth factor
- KPV tripeptide
- Link-N
- MOTS-c
- TB-500
