= Shelphs =

Shewanella-like phosphatases, abbreviated as Shelphs, are a group of enzymes structurally related to protein serine/threonine phosphatases (PPP family). Unlike the canonical subfamilies found in eukaryotes (PP1, PP2A, calcineurin, PP5 and PPEF/PP7), Shelphs span the eukaryote-prokaryote boundary and are found in several genera of Pseudomonadota (formerly proteobacteria), in plants, red algae, fungi and some unicellular parasites, including a causative agent of malaria Plasmodium, Cryptosporidium and kinetoplastids (Trypanosoma and Leishmania species).

The prototypic member of the group, a phosphatase from a psychrophilic bacterium Shewanella, has been studied as a model to understand the mechanisms that contribute to the high catalytic efficiency of enzymes from organisms adapted to low temperatures. Although PPP phosphatases in general are serine/threonine specific, Shewanella phosphatase is tyrosine specific. One of the two Shelph isoforms in plants is predicted to be located in the chloroplast.

Due to the absence of Shelphs in humans, these phosphatases have recently attracted attention as potential targets for new antiparasitic drug discovery.
