= Pinchas Cohen =

American gerontologist

Pinchas Cohen is the dean of the USC Leonard Davis School of Gerontology, holds the William and Sylvia Kugel Dean's Chair in Gerontology and serves as the executive director of the Ethel Percy Andrus Gerontology Center. He is a USC Distinguished Professor of Gerontology, Medicine, and Biological Sciences.

Cohen graduated in 1986 with highest honors from the medical school at Technion in Israel and trained at Stanford University between 1986 and 1992. He held his first faculty position at the University of Pennsylvania from 1992 to 1999. Until summer 2012, he was a professor and vice chair for research at the Mattel Children's Hospital UCLA at the Ronald Reagan UCLA Medical Center, as well as the co-director of the UCSD/UCLA Diabetes Research Center. He served on the advisory board for the Milken Institute Center for the Future of Aging.

Cohen has received numerous awards for his research, including a National Institute on Aging "EUREKA" Award and the NIH Director Transformative R01 Grant. He also received the Glenn Award for Research in Biological Mechanisms of Aging and the American Federation of Aging Research Irving S. Wright Award of Distinction. He is a Fellow of the American Association for the Advancement of Science and of the Gerontological Society of America as well as a Senior Member of the National Academy of Inventors and a member of the Academy for Health and Lifespan Research. In 2025, he was named the recipient of the Gerontological Society of America's Robert W. Kleemeier Award for "outstanding research in the field of gerontology."

== Research ==
Cohen's research focuses on aging, neurodegeneration, cancer and diabetes with an emphasis on the emerging science of mitochondrial-derived peptides, which he discovered. He has also discussed the possibilities of applying personalized medicine to aging science, coining the term "personalized aging."

His laboratory was one of three teams that independently discovered humanin (Cohen and his team had been screening for proteins that interact with IGFBP3). Other mitochondrial peptides discovered by the Cohen laboratory include SHLP 1, 2, 3, 4, 5, and 6 and MOTS-C. The Yiddish-sounding names given to the microproteins discovered in the Cohen lab are a nod to Cohen's Jewish and Israeli heritage.

He holds several patents for novel peptides and is the co-founder of CohBar, a biotechnology company developing peptides found in mitochondria for diabetes treatment. He is also the founder of MENTSH Therapeutics. Cohen has published more than 350 papers in top scientific journals.

Cohen has expressed optimism regarding the therapeutic potential of peptides, noting that these findings could "start a new era of drug discovery." However, he has also emphasized that individuals should not be taking peptides as off-label supplements and should instead wait for potential treatments to be vetted in clinical studies: "The history of shortcuts is not a happy one."

An expert in the field, Cohen was president of the Growth Hormone Society and served on the Endocrine Society Steering Committee. He has sat on multiple NIH study sections and on several editorial boards.
