= TB-500 =

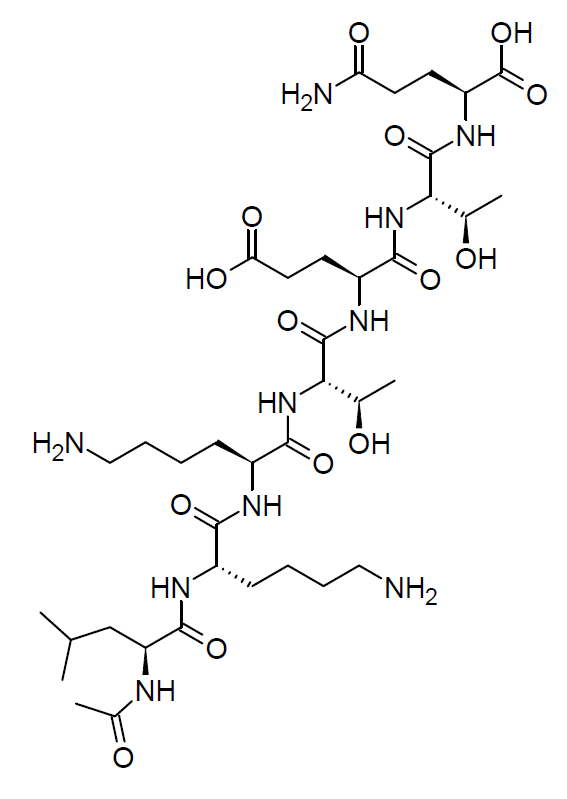
- Chemical structure of TB-500

Identifiers
- IUPAC name: (2S)-2-[[(2S,3R)-2-[[(2S)-2-[[(2S,3R)-2-[[(2S)-2-[[(2S)-2-[[(2S)-2-acetamido-4-methylpentanoyl]amino]-6-aminohexanoyl]amino]-6-aminohexanoyl]amino]-3-hydroxybutanoyl]amino]-4-carboxybutanoyl]amino]-3-hydroxybutanoyl]amino]-5-amino-5-oxopentanoic acid
- CAS Number: 885340-08-9
- PubChem CID: 62707662
- ChemSpider: 72380051
- UNII: QHK6Z47GTG

Chemical and physical data
- Formula: C_{38}H_{68}N_{10}O_{14}
- Molar mass: 889.018 g·mol^{−1}
- 3D model (JSmol): Interactive image
- SMILES: C[C@H]([C@@H](C(=O)N[C@@H](CCC(=O)O)C(=O)N[C@@H]([C@@H](C)O)C(=O)N[C@@H](CCC(=O)N)C(=O)O)NC(=O)[C@H](CCCCN)NC(=O)[C@H](CCCCN)NC(=O)[C@H](CC(C)C)NC(=O)C)O
- InChI: InChI=1S/C38H68N10O14/c1-19(2)18-27(42-22(5)51)35(58)44-23(10-6-8-16-39)32(55)43-24(11-7-9-17-40)33(56)47-30(20(3)49)36(59)45-25(13-15-29(53)54)34(57)48-31(21(4)50)37(60)46-26(38(61)62)12-14-28(41)52/h19-21,23-27,30-31,49-50H,6-18,39-40H2,1-5H3,(H2,41,52)(H,42,51)(H,43,55)(H,44,58)(H,45,59)(H,46,60)(H,47,56)(H,48,57)(H,53,54)(H,61,62)/t20-,21-,23+,24+,25+,26+,27+,30+,31+/m1/s1; Key:ADKDNDYYIZUVCZ-ZQNQAVPYSA-N

TB-500 (Ac-LKKTETQ) is a synthetic heptapeptide that corresponds to the N-acetylated active fragment (amino acids 17–23) of the endogenous signaling factor thymosin beta-4. It is claimed to increase muscle growth and accelerate wound healing and tissue repair, reduce inflammation, and improve flexibility. There is concern it could be used in sports doping. It gained attention during the 2020s uptick in off-label peptide use. It has not undergone any human trials and high levels of it are associated with tumor development.

It has been encountered as a designer drug mainly in racehorses, but is also prohibited for use by athletes in competition by the World Anti-Doping Agency, and is classified as a prescription medicine in some jurisdictions such as Australia and New Zealand.

TB-500 and several of its metabolites can be detected in equine urine and plasma following administration of TB-500 using liquid chromatography–mass spectrometry, with metabolite profiling enabling identification of peptide-derived products in biological samples.

== See also ==
- Ac-SDKP
- Adamax
- Adipotide
- BPC-157
- CJC-1295
- Epidermal growth factor
- Link-N
- Mechano growth factor
- PEPITEM
- Thymalfasin
