= Humanin =

Micropeptide encoded by mitochondrial DNA

MT-RNR2

Identifiers
- Aliases: RNR2, mitochondrially encoded 16S RNA, MTRNR2
- External IDs: OMIM: 561010; MGI: 102492; GeneCards: RNR2
Available structures
PDB	Human UniProt search: PDBe RCSB
PDB	List of PDB id codes 1Y32, 2GD3, 5GIW
Gene ontology
Molecular function	signaling receptor binding; protein binding; receptor antagonist activity
Cellular component	cytoplasm; perinuclear region of cytoplasm; extracellular region; mitochondrion
Biological process	negative regulation of apoptotic process; leukocyte chemotaxis; cellular iron ion homeostasis; apoptotic process; extracellular negative regulation of signal transduction; G protein-coupled receptor signaling pathway; negative regulation of execution phase of apoptosis; negative regulation of signaling receptor activity
Sources:Amigo / QuickGO
Orthologs
Databases	NCBI: entry; OMA: entry
Species	Human	Mouse
Entrez	4550	17725
Ensembl	ENSG00000210082	ENSMUSG00000064339
UniProt	Q8IVG9	n/a
RefSeq (mRNA)	n/a	n/a
RefSeq (protein)	n/a	n/a
Location (UCSC)	n/a	n/a
PubMed search
- Wikidata
View/Edit Human	View/Edit Mouse

Humanin
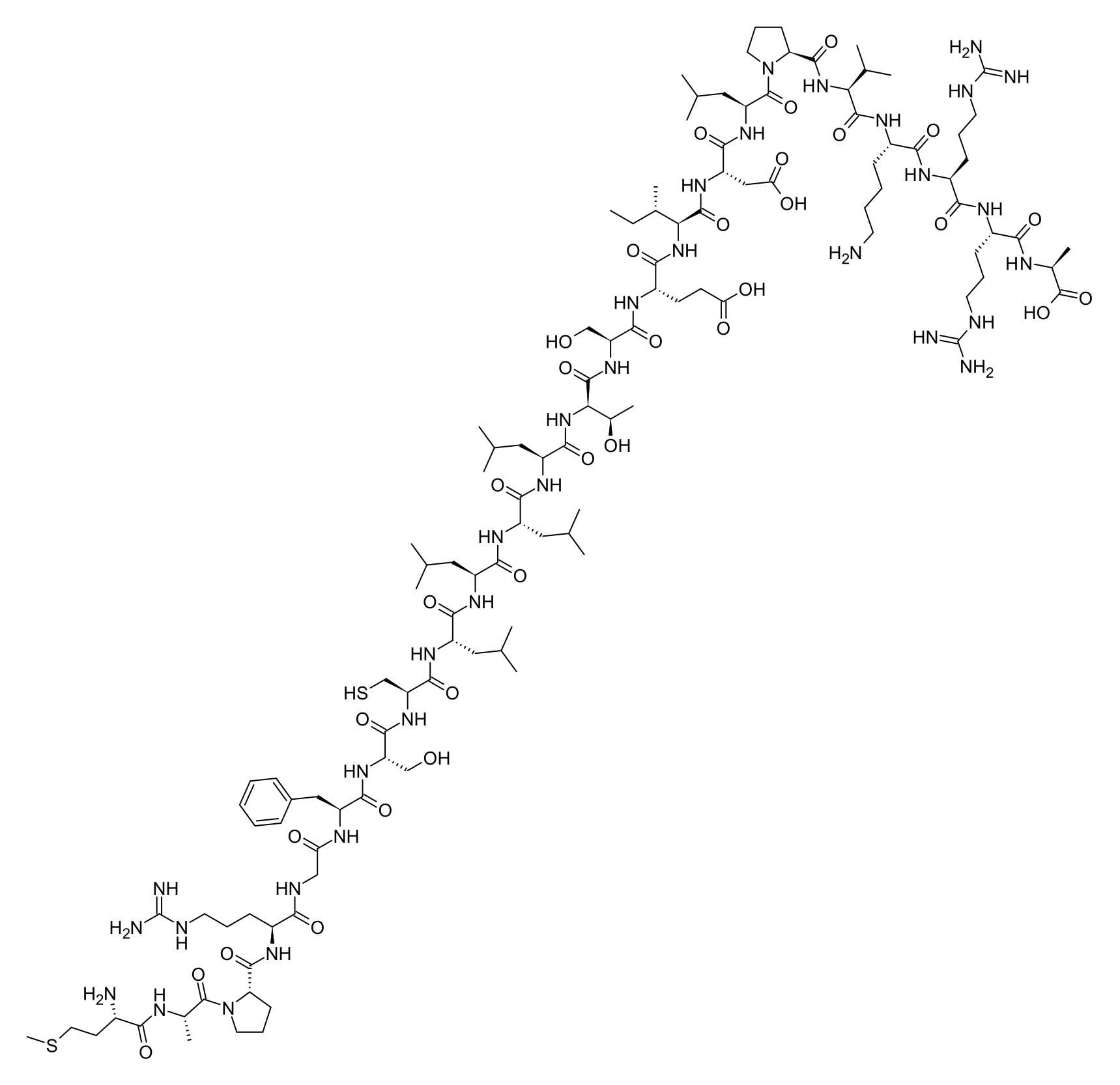

Identifiers
- IUPAC name: (4S)-5-[[(2S,3S)-1-[[(2S)-1-[[(2S)-1-[(2S)-2-[[(2S)-1-[[(2S)-6-amino-1-[[(2S)-5-carbamimidamido-1-[[(2S)-5-carbamimidamido-1-[[(1S)-1-carboxyethyl]amino]-1-oxopentan-2-yl]amino]-1-oxopentan-2-yl]amino]-1-oxohexan-2-yl]amino]-3-methyl-1-oxobutan-2-yl]carbamoyl]pyrrolidin-1-yl]-4-methyl-1-oxopentan-2-yl]amino]-3-carboxy-1-oxopropan-2-yl]amino]-3-methyl-1-oxopentan-2-yl]amino]-4-[[(2S)-2-[[(2S,3R)-2-[[(2S)-2-[[(2S)-2-[[(2S)-2-[[(2S)-2-[[(2R)-2-[[(2S)-2-[[(2S)-2-[[2-[[(2S)-2-[[(2S)-1-[(2S)-2-[[(2S)-2-amino-4-methylsulfanylbutanoyl]amino]propanoyl]pyrrolidine-2-carbonyl]amino]-5-carbamimidamidopentanoyl]amino]acetyl]amino]-3-phenylpropanoyl]amino]-3-hydroxypropanoyl]amino]-3-sulfanylpropanoyl]amino]-4-methylpentanoyl]amino]-4-methylpentanoyl]amino]-4-methylpentanoyl]amino]-4-methylpentanoyl]amino]-3-hydroxybutanoyl]amino]-3-hydroxypropanoyl]amino]-5-oxopentanoic acid
- CAS Number: 330936-69-1
- PubChem CID: 16131438

Chemical and physical data
- Formula: C_{119}H_{204}N_{34}O_{32}S_{2}
- Molar mass: 2687.27 g·mol^{−1}
- 3D model (JSmol): Interactive image
- SMILES: CC[C@H](C)[C@@H](C(=O)N[C@@H](CC(=O)O)C(=O)N[C@@H](CC(C)C)C(=O)N1CCC[C@H]1C(=O)N[C@@H](C(C)C)C(=O)N[C@@H](CCCCN)C(=O)N[C@@H](CCCNC(=N)N)C(=O)N[C@@H](CCCNC(=N)N)C(=O)N[C@@H](C)C(=O)O)NC(=O)[C@H](CCC(=O)O)NC(=O)[C@H](CO)NC(=O)[C@H]([C@@H](C)O)NC(=O)[C@H](CC(C)C)NC(=O)[C@H](CC(C)C)NC(=O)[C@H](CC(C)C)NC(=O)[C@H](CC(C)C)NC(=O)[C@H](CS)NC(=O)[C@H](CO)NC(=O)[C@H](CC2=CC=CC=C2)NC(=O)CNC(=O)[C@H](CCCNC(=N)N)NC(=O)[C@@H]3CCCN3C(=O)[C@H](C)NC(=O)[C@H](CCSC)N
- InChI: InChI=1S/C119H204N34O32S2/c1-19-65(14)92(112(180)144-81(54-90(160)161)104(172)145-82(52-63(10)11)115(183)153-46-29-37-87(153)110(178)149-91(64(12)13)111(179)139-72(32-23-24-41-120)97(165)136-74(35-27-44-130-119(126)127)98(166)135-73(34-26-43-129-118(124)125)96(164)133-67(16)116(184)185)150-99(167)75(38-39-89(158)159)137-106(174)84(57-155)147-113(181)93(68(17)156)151-105(173)79(51-62(8)9)142-101(169)77(49-60(4)5)140-100(168)76(48-59(2)3)141-102(170)78(50-61(6)7)143-108(176)85(58-186)148-107(175)83(56-154)146-103(171)80(53-69-30-21-20-22-31-69)134-88(157)55-131-95(163)71(33-25-42-128-117(122)123)138-109(177)86-36-28-45-152(86)114(182)66(15)132-94(162)70(121)40-47-187-18/h20-22,30-31,59-68,70-87,91-93,154-156,186H,19,23-29,32-58,120-121H2,1-18H3,(H,131,163)(H,132,162)(H,133,164)(H,134,157)(H,135,166)(H,136,165)(H,137,174)(H,138,177)(H,139,179)(H,140,168)(H,141,170)(H,142,169)(H,143,176)(H,144,180)(H,145,172)(H,146,171)(H,147,181)(H,148,175)(H,149,178)(H,150,167)(H,151,173)(H,158,159)(H,160,161)(H,184,185)(H4,122,123,128)(H4,124,125,129)(H4,126,127,130)/t65-,66-,67-,68+,70-,71-,72-,73-,74-,75-,76-,77-,78-,79-,80-,81-,82-,83-,84-,85-,86-,87-,91-,92-,93-/m0/s1; Key:DPEUWKZJZIPZKE-OFANTOPUSA-N

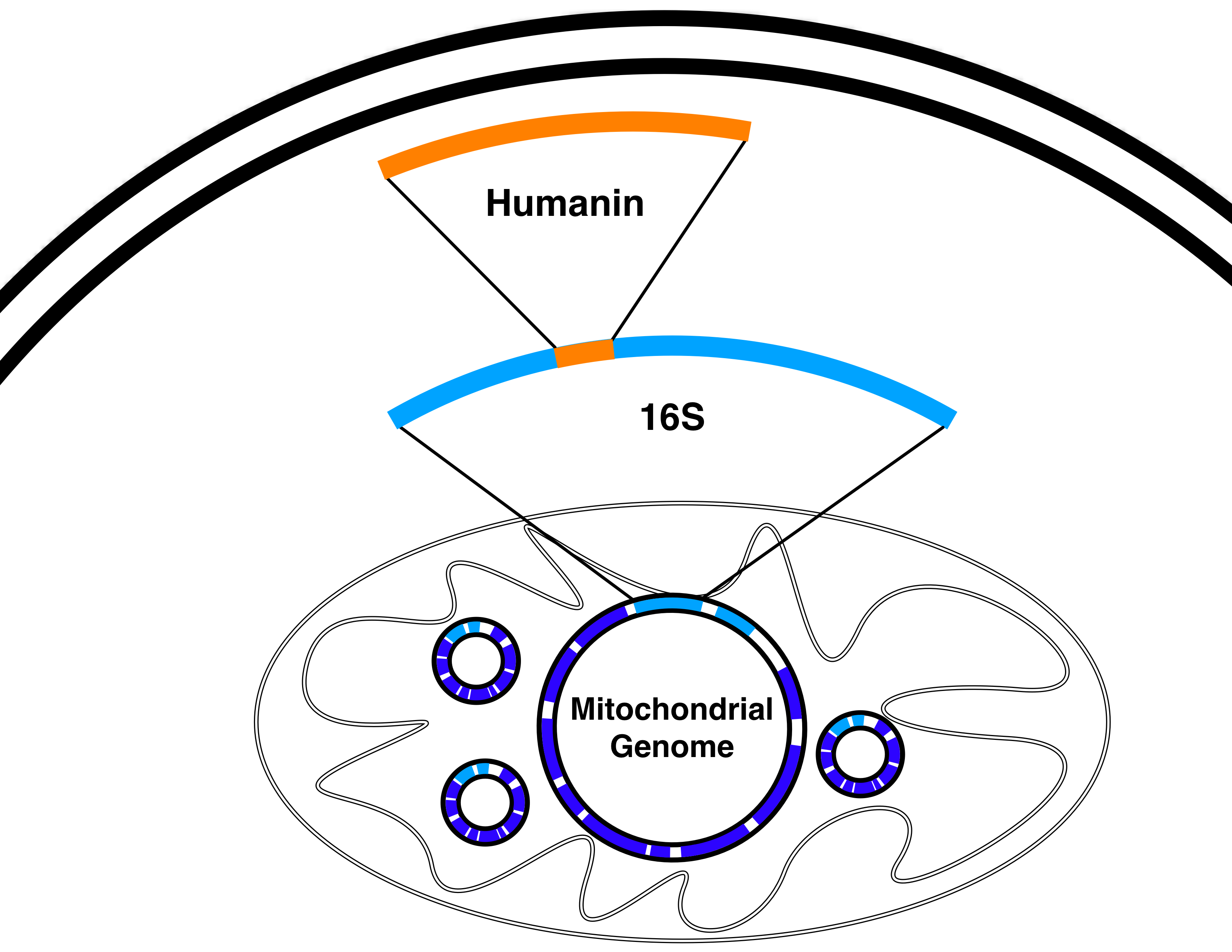
The humanin gene is found within the 16S rRNA gene (MT-RNR2) in the mitochondrial genome

Humanin is a micropeptide encoded in the mitochondrial genome by the 16S ribosomal RNA gene, MT-RNR2. Its structure contains a three-turn α-helix, and no symmetry.

In in vitro and animal models, it appears to have cytoprotective effects.

== Gene ==
Humanin is encoded in the mitochondrial genome by the 16S ribosomal RNA gene, MT-RNR2. Multiple paralogs are found in the nuclear genome (due to nuclear mitochondrial DNA segments) and are named MTRNR2L followed by a number. It is not known whether these paralogous isoforms are completely unexpressed.

== Protein ==
The expressed peptide contains a three-turn α-helix, and has no symmetry.

The length of the peptide depends on where it is produced. If it is produced inside the mitochondria it will be 21 amino acids long. If it is produced outside the mitochondria, in the cytosol, it will be 24 amino acids long. Both peptides have been shown to have biological activity.

The full length 24 amino acid version of humanin has the sequence MAPRGFSCLLLLTSEIDLPVKRRA, with four residues cleaved from the C terminal end to form the 20 amino acid mitochondrial version MAPRGFSCLLLLTSEIDLPV. Several other natural isoforms are also known with slight variations to the amino acid sequence. Synthetic versions often have one or more amino acid changes to increase stability and improve activity, such as HNG with a S→G substitution at position 14, and HNGF6A which has an F→A substitution at position 6 as well. Humanin-glycine (HNG) is up to 1000x more potent than the natural version depending how the activity is assayed, and so is one of the more common synthetic analogues used in research and investigated for potential clinical applications. Shorter fragments such as HN(1-19) and HN(1-17) also retain some activity but are generally less potent.

== Other species ==
Humanin is the most well-conserved of the mitochondria-derived peptides, found in such diverse species as humans, naked mole rats, and nematodes. Overexpression of humanin in Caenorhabditis elegans has been shown to extend the lifespan of that nematode by increasing autophagy.

The rat, Rattus norvegicus, has a gene, rattin (C0HLU6, "Humanin-like protein"), that encodes a 38 amino acid peptide homologous to humanin. The two genes produce cDNAs that show 88% sequence identity. The peptides are 81% identical, with the carboxyl terminal sequence in rattin being 14 amino acids longer than in humanin. Of the 24 amino acids in the rest of the rat sequence, 20 are identical to the amino acids in the human sequence.

The mouse MT-RNR2 humanin ortholog is a pseudogene, so no humanin is produced from the mtDNA. However, the nuclear genome harbors (like in humans) many copies of mitochondrial genomes, and one copy of the humanin homolog, Gm20594 (J3QJY3), is actively expressed.

== Function ==
Humanin has several cytoprotective effects. Humanin and related peptides have antiinflammatory, immunomodulatory and neuroprotective effects and are of interest in the treatment of cardiovascular diseases such as atherosclerosis and heart failure, and neurodegenerative disorders such as Alzheimer's disease, Parkinson's disease, and Huntington's disease.

== Interactions ==
Extracellular interaction with a tripartite receptor composed of gp130, WSX1, and CNTFR, as well as interaction with the formyl peptide receptor 2 (formylpeptide-like-1 receptor) have been published.

Intracellular interaction with BAX, tBID, IGFBP3, and TRIM11 may also be required for the effects of humanin.

== Discovery ==
Humanin was the first mitochondria-derived peptide to be discovered. Humanin was independently found by three different labs looking at different parameters. The first to publish, in 2001, was the Nishimoto lab, which found humanin while looking for possible proteins that could protect cells from amyloid beta, a major component of Alzheimer's disease. The Reed lab found humanin when screening for proteins that could interact with Bcl-2-associated X protein (Bax), a major protein involved in apoptosis. The Pinchas Cohen lab independently discovered humanin when screening for proteins that interact with IGFBP3.

== Research ==
Experiments using cultured cells have demonstrated that humanin has both neuroprotective as well as cytoprotective effects and experiments in rodents have found that it has protective effects in Alzheimer's disease models, Huntington's disease models and stroke models.

Humanin is proposed to have myriad neuroprotective and cytoprotective effects. Studies in both cells and rodents have found that administration of humanin or humanin derivatives increases survival and/or physiological parameters in Alzheimer's disease models. In addition to Alzheimer's disease, humanin has other neuroprotective effects against models of Huntington's disease, prion disease, and stroke.

Beyond the possible neuroprotective effects, humanin protects against oxidative stress, atherosclerotic plaque formation, and heart attack. Humanin activates chaperone-mediated autophagy in a dose-dependent manner. Humanin decreases production of inflammatory cytokines, which is part of its anti-apoptotic effect. Metabolic effects have also been demonstrated and humanin helps improve survival of pancreatic beta-cells, which may help with type 1 diabetes, and increases insulin sensitivity, which may help with type 2 diabetes. In rats, the humanin analog appears to normalize glucose levels and reduce diabetes symptoms.

Rattin shows the same ability as humanin to defend neurons from the toxicity of beta-amyloid, associated with the degeneration in Alzheimer's disease.

Humanin was shown to impair chemotherapy and promote tumor growth and metastasis formation in breast cancer, and to promote tumor growth in brain cancer (glioblastoma, one of the most aggressive types of tumors).

== See also ==
- Small humanin-like peptides, are a group of peptides found in the mitochondrial 16S rRNA, and also possess retrograde signaling functions.
- MOTS-c, is a similar mitochondrial derived peptide with an overlapping effects profile with humanin peptides.
- PEPITEM, an antiinflammatory peptide which acts by inhibiting trafficking of T cells.
- Thymosin α1, an unrelated peptide which has similar immunomodulatory effects.
