= CJC-1295 =

Chemical compound

Clinical data
- Other names: CJC-1295 with DAC
- Routes of administration: Subcutaneous injection
- ATC code: None

Identifiers
- CAS Number: 446262-90-4
- PubChem CID: 56841945
- ChemSpider: 77431488
- UNII: 62RC32V9N7

Chemical and physical data
- Formula: C_{165}H_{269}N_{47}O_{46}
- Molar mass: 3647.250 g·mol^{−1}
- 3D model (JSmol): Interactive image
- SMILES: NC([C@H](CCCCNC(CCN1C(C=CC1=O)=O)=O)NC([C@H](CCCNC(N)=N)NC([C@H](CO)NC([C@H](CC(C)C)NC([C@@]([C@H](CC)C)([H])NC([C@@H](NC([C@H](CCC(N)=O)NC([C@H](CC(C)C)NC([C@H](CC(C)C)NC([C@H](CCCCN)NC([C@H](CCCNC(N)=N)NC([C@@H](NC([C@H](CO)NC([C@H](CC(C)C)NC([C@H](CCC(N)=O)NC([C@@H](NC([C@H](CC(C)C)NC([C@H](C(C)C)NC([C@H](CCCCN)NC([C@H](CCCNC(N)=N)NC([C@@H](NC([C@H](CO)NC([C@H](CCC(N)=O)NC([C@@]([C@@H](C)O)([H])NC([C@@H](NC([C@@]([C@H](CC)C)([H])NC([C@@H](NC([C@@H](NC([C@H](NC([C@@H](N[H])CC2=CC=C(O)C=C2)=O)C)=O)CC(O)=O)=O)C)=O)=O)CC3=CC=CC=C3)=O)=O)=O)=O)CC4=CC=C(O)C=C4)=O)=O)=O)=O)=O)C)=O)=O)=O)=O)C)=O)=O)=O)=O)=O)=O)CC(O)=O)=O)=O)=O)=O)=O)=O
- InChI: InChI=1S/C165H269N47O46/c1-22-87(15)130(209-137(233)92(20)185-148(244)116(76-127(225)226)196-136(232)89(17)183-138(234)99(168)73-95-44-48-97(217)49-45-95)160(256)204-115(74-94-36-25-24-26-37-94)154(250)211-132(93(21)216)162(258)195-108(54-57-123(171)221)145(241)205-120(80-215)158(254)200-114(75-96-46-50-98(218)51-47-96)153(249)192-105(43-35-66-182-165(177)178)141(237)191-102(40-28-31-62-167)146(242)208-129(86(13)14)159(255)202-109(68-81(3)4)147(243)184-90(18)135(231)189-106(52-55-121(169)219)143(239)198-112(71-84(9)10)151(247)206-118(78-213)156(252)186-91(19)134(230)188-103(41-33-64-180-163(173)174)140(236)190-101(39-27-30-61-166)142(238)197-111(70-83(7)8)150(246)199-110(69-82(5)6)149(245)194-107(53-56-122(170)220)144(240)201-117(77-128(227)228)155(251)210-131(88(16)23-2)161(257)203-113(72-85(11)12)152(248)207-119(79-214)157(253)193-104(42-34-65-181-164(175)176)139(235)187-100(133(172)229)38-29-32-63-179-124(222)60-67-212-125(223)58-59-126(212)224/h24-26,36-37,44-51,58-59,81-93,99-120,129-132,213-218H,22-23,27-35,38-43,52-57,60-80,166-168H2,1-21H3,(H2,169,219)(H2,170,220)(H2,171,221)(H2,172,229)(H,179,222)(H,183,234)(H,184,243)(H,185,244)(H,186,252)(H,187,235)(H,188,230)(H,189,231)(H,190,236)(H,191,237)(H,192,249)(H,193,253)(H,194,245)(H,195,258)(H,196,232)(H,197,238)(H,198,239)(H,199,246)(H,200,254)(H,201,240)(H,202,255)(H,203,257)(H,204,256)(H,205,241)(H,206,247)(H,207,248)(H,208,242)(H,209,233)(H,210,251)(H,211,250)(H,225,226)(H,227,228)(H4,173,174,180)(H4,175,176,181)(H4,177,178,182)/t87-,88-,89+,90-,91-,92-,93+,99-,100-,101-,102-,103-,104-,105-,106-,107-,108-,109-,110-,111-,112-,113-,114-,115-,116-,117-,118-,119-,120-,129-,130-,131-,132-/m0/s1; Key:ZUQGTWKGESAQCD-ZGFIGYLBSA-N

CJC-1295 DAC, also known as DAC:GRF (short for drug affinity complex:growth hormone-releasing factor), is a synthetic analogue of growth hormone-releasing hormone (GHRH) (also known as growth hormone-releasing factor (GRF)) and a growth hormone secretagogue (GHS) which was developed by ConjuChem Biotechnologies. It is a modified form of GHRH (1-29) with improved pharmacokinetics, especially in regard to half-life.

== Effects ==
CJC-1295 may markedly increase plasma growth hormone (GH) and insulin-like growth factor 1 (IGF-1) levels in animals and humans. With a single injection, in human subjects, CJC-1295 DAC may increase plasma GH levels by 2- to 10-fold for 6 days or longer and plasma IGF-1 levels by 0.5- to 3-fold for 9 to 11 days. With the inclusion of the DAC additive, the drug has an estimated half-life of about 6 to 8 days in humans. With multiple doses of CJC-1295, IGF-1 levels were found to remain elevated in humans for up to 28 days.

CJC-1295 has been shown to extend the half-life and bioavailability of growth-hormone-releasing hormone 1-29 and stimulate insulin-like growth factor 1 secretion. It increases the half-life of acting agents by bioconjugation. The extended half-life is achieved through the addition of a drug affinity complex (DAC) that binds to albumin, thus prolonging the peptide's presence in the bloodstream. It is primarily used for its potential to stimulate the release of growth hormone (GH) from the pituitary gland.

== Risks ==
CJC-1295 was under investigation for the treatment of lipodystrophy and growth hormone deficiency and reached phase II clinical trials but was discontinued upon the death of one of the trial subjects. The attending physician of the trial believed that the most likely explanation for the incident was that the patient had asymptomatic coronary artery disease with plaque rupture and occlusion, and that the occurrence was unrelated to treatment with CJC-1295. Research was terminated nonetheless as a precaution.

== Structure ==
CJC-1295 and Modified GRF (1-29) are falsely equated in several scientific papers. CJC-1295, CJC-1295 DAC, and CJC-1295 with DAC are synonyms, while Modified GRF (1-29), also known as CJC-1295 without DAC, lacks the C-terminus extension with N^{ɛ}-maleimidopropionyl-Lysine, which is referred to as DAC.

The IUPAC modification nomenclature for the peptide CJC-1295 is N^{ɛ30}-maleimidopropionyl-[D-Ala^{2}, Gln^{8}, Ala^{15}, Leu^{27}]-Sermorelin-Lys^{30}.

Sermorelin: H-Tyr-Ala^{2}-Asp-Ala-Ile-Phe-Thr-Asn^{8}-Ser-Tyr-Arg-Lys-Val-Leu-Gly^{15}-Gln-Leu-Ser-Ala-Arg-Lys-Leu-Leu-Gln-Asp-Ile-Met^{27}-Ser-Arg-NH_{2}

CJC-1295 without DAC: H-Tyr-D-Ala^{2}-Asp-Ala-Ile-Phe-Thr-Gln^{8}-Ser-Tyr-Arg-Lys-Val-Leu-Ala^{15}-Gln-Leu-Ser-Ala-Arg-Lys-Leu-Leu-Gln-Asp-Ile-Leu^{27}-Ser-Arg-NH_{2}

CJC-1295: H-Tyr-D-Ala^{2}-Asp-Ala-Ile-Phe-Thr-Gln^{8}-Ser-Tyr-Arg-Lys-Val-Leu-Ala^{15}-Gln-Leu-Ser-Ala-Arg-Lys-Leu-Leu-Gln-Asp-Ile-Leu^{27}-Ser-Arg-(N^{ɛ}-maleimidopropionyl-)Lys^{30}-NH_{2}

== See also ==
- List of growth hormone secretagogues
