= Adamax =

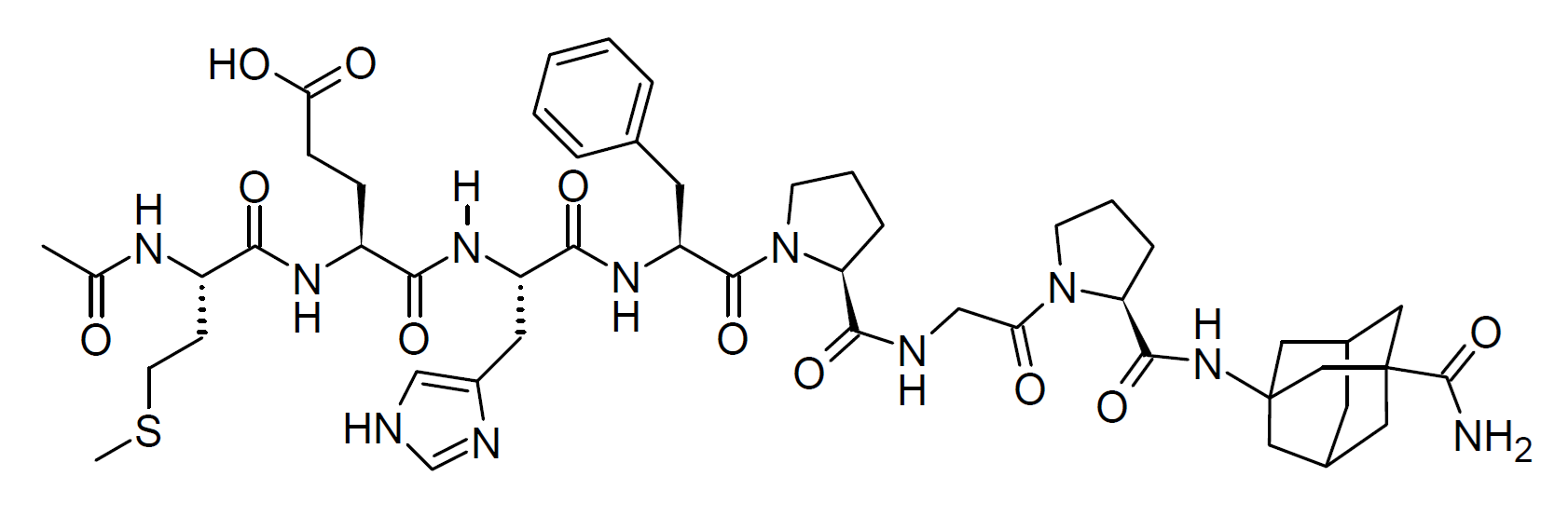

Chemical and physical data
- Formula: C_{50}H_{69}N_{11}O_{11}S
- Molar mass: 1032.23 g·mol^{−1}
- 3D model (JSmol): Interactive image
- SMILES: O=C(N)C12CC3(NC(=O)[C@@H]4CCCN4C(=O)CNC(=O)[C@@H]4CCCN4C(=O)[C@@H](NC(=O)[C@@H](NC(=O)[C@@H](NC(=O)[C@@H](NC(=O)C)CCSC)CCC(O)=O)Cc4nc[NH]c4)Cc4ccccc4)CC(C1)CC(C3)C2
- InChI: InChI=1S/C50H69N11O11S/c1-29(62)55-35(14-17-73-2)43(67)56-34(12-13-41(64)65)42(66)57-36(20-33-25-52-28-54-33)44(68)58-37(19-30-8-4-3-5-9-30)47(71)61-16-7-10-38(61)45(69)53-26-40(63)60-15-6-11-39(60)46(70)59-50-23-31-18-32(24-50)22-49(21-31,27-50)48(51)72/h3-5,8-9,25,28,31-32,34-39H,6-7,10-24,26-27H2,1-2H3,(H2,51,72)(H,52,54)(H,53,69)(H,55,62)(H,56,67)(H,57,66)(H,58,68)(H,59,70)(H,64,65)/t31?,32?,34-,35-,36-,37-,38-,39-,49?,50?/m0/s1; Key:SWAHDDQBIQRRFH-MHNCVWKMSA-N

Adamax (Ac-MEHFPGP^{A}G-NH2) is a synthetic peptide derivative that is a designer analogue of semax, described as semax modified with the N-terminal and C-terminal modifications found in Peptide 021. It has been identified as a designer drug in border seizures and has been suggested to be classified as a prescription medicine in New Zealand.
