= Sermorelin =

Pharmaceutical drug

Clinical data
- Trade names: Geref, Gerel
- Other names: GRF 1–29
- AHFS/Drugs.com: Micromedex Detailed Consumer Information
- Routes of administration: Injection
- ATC code: H01AC04 (WHO) V04CD03 (WHO)

Legal status
- Legal status: US: Discontinued

Identifiers
- IUPAC name: L-Tyrosyl-L-alanyl-L-α-aspartyl-L-alanyl-L-isoleucyl-L-phenylalanyl-L-threonyl-L-asparaginyl-L-seryl-L-tyrosyl-L-arginyl-L-lysyl-L-valyl-L-leucylglycyl-L-glutaminyl-L-leucyl-L-seryl-L-alanyl-L-arginyl-L-lysyl-L-leucyl-L-leucyl-L-glutaminyl-L-α-aspartyl-L-isoleucyl-L-methionyl-L-seryl-L-argininamide
- CAS Number: 86168-78-7
- PubChem CID: 16132413
- DrugBank: DB00010
- ChemSpider: 17289071
- UNII: 89243S03TE
- KEGG: D08509
- ChEBI: CHEBI:9118
- ChEMBL: ChEMBL1201490
- CompTox Dashboard (EPA): DTXSID70903978

Chemical and physical data
- Formula: C_{149}H_{246}N_{44}O_{42}S
- Molar mass: 3357.93 g·mol^{−1}
- 3D model (JSmol): Interactive image
- SMILES: CC[C@H](C)[C@@H](C(=O)N[C@@H](CC1=CC=CC=C1)C(=O)N[C@@H]([C@@H](C)O)C(=O)N[C@@H](CC(=O)N)C(=O)N[C@@H](CO)C(=O)N[C@@H](CC2=CC=C(C=C2)O)C(=O)N[C@@H](CCCNC(=N)N)C(=O)N[C@@H](CCCCN)C(=O)N[C@@H](C(C)C)C(=O)N[C@@H](CC(C)C)C(=O)NCC(=O)N[C@@H](CCC(=O)N)C(=O)N[C@@H](CC(C)C)C(=O)N[C@@H](CO)C(=O)N[C@@H](C)C(=O)N[C@@H](CCCNC(=N)N)C(=O)N[C@@H](CCCCN)C(=O)N[C@@H](CC(C)C)C(=O)N[C@@H](CC(C)C)C(=O)N[C@@H](CCC(=O)N)C(=O)N[C@@H](CC(=O)O)C(=O)N[C@@H]([C@@H](C)CC)C(=O)N[C@@H](CCSC)C(=O)N[C@@H](CO)C(=O)N[C@@H](CCCNC(=N)N)C(=O)N)NC(=O)[C@H](C)NC(=O)[C@H](CC(=O)O)NC(=O)[C@H](C)NC(=O)[C@H](CC3=CC=C(C=C3)O)N
- InChI: InChI=1S/C149H246N44O42S/c1-20-77(13)116(191-122(211)81(17)168-132(221)104(66-113(204)205)178-121(210)79(15)167-123(212)88(152)62-84-39-43-86(198)44-40-84)145(234)185-102(63-83-32-23-22-24-33-83)138(227)193-118(82(18)197)146(235)186-103(65-111(155)202)137(226)189-108(71-196)142(231)182-101(64-85-41-45-87(199)46-42-85)136(225)175-93(38-31-56-165-149(161)162)126(215)174-91(35-26-28-53-151)131(220)190-115(76(11)12)143(232)184-97(58-72(3)4)124(213)166-68-112(203)170-94(47-49-109(153)200)128(217)180-100(61-75(9)10)135(224)188-106(69-194)140(229)169-80(16)120(209)172-92(37-30-55-164-148(159)160)125(214)173-90(34-25-27-52-150)127(216)179-99(60-74(7)8)134(223)181-98(59-73(5)6)133(222)176-95(48-50-110(154)201)129(218)183-105(67-114(206)207)139(228)192-117(78(14)21-2)144(233)177-96(51-57-236-19)130(219)187-107(70-195)141(230)171-89(119(156)208)36-29-54-163-147(157)158/h22-24,32-33,39-46,72-82,88-108,115-118,194-199H,20-21,25-31,34-38,47-71,150-152H2,1-19H3,(H2,153,200)(H2,154,201)(H2,155,202)(H2,156,208)(H,166,213)(H,167,212)(H,168,221)(H,169,229)(H,170,203)(H,171,230)(H,172,209)(H,173,214)(H,174,215)(H,175,225)(H,176,222)(H,177,233)(H,178,210)(H,179,216)(H,180,217)(H,181,223)(H,182,231)(H,183,218)(H,184,232)(H,185,234)(H,186,235)(H,187,219)(H,188,224)(H,189,226)(H,190,220)(H,191,211)(H,192,228)(H,193,227)(H,204,205)(H,206,207)(H4,157,158,163)(H4,159,160,164)(H4,161,162,165)/t77-,78-,79-,80-,81-,82+,88-,89-,90-,91-,92-,93-,94-,95-,96-,97-,98-,99-,100-,101-,102-,103-,104-,105-,106-,107-,108-,115-,116-,117-,118-/m0/s1; Key:WGWPRVFKDLAUQJ-MITYVQBRSA-N

Sermorelin acetate (INN; brand names Geref, Gerel), also known as GHRH (1-29), is a peptide analogue of growth hormone-releasing hormone (GHRH) which is used as a diagnostic agent to assess growth hormone (GH) secretion for the purpose of diagnosing growth hormone deficiency. It is a 29-amino acid polypeptide representing the 1–29 fragment from endogenous human GHRH, thought to be the shortest fully functional fragment of GHRH.

Sermorelin was approved by the US Food and Drug Administration (FDA) in 1997 for use as a treatment for children with growth hormone deficiency or growth failure. However, as of 2008, the manufacturer discontinued the production of sermorelin for commercial reasons, and it is no longer available as an FDA-approved drug. Despite this, it may still be used in some off-label contexts or obtained through compounding pharmacies.

== Medical usage ==
Sermorelin was used to treat children with growth hormone deficiency or growth failure by stimulating the pituitary gland to release growth hormone (GH), thereby increasing plasma GH levels.

== Mechanism of action ==
Sermorelin binds to the growth hormone-releasing hormone receptor (GHRHR), mimicking the effects of the full-length GHRH in promoting growth hormone secretion.

Sermorelin's effects are regulated by negative feedback through the inhibitory hormone somatostatin, making it difficult to overdose, unlike exogenous rhGH (a synthetic version of human GH). This interaction with somatostatin prompts the pituitary to release hGH in bursts, which mirrors natural hormone rhythms rather than the constant levels produced by rhGH injections. As a result, sermorelin avoids tachyphylaxis by promoting a more physiological pattern of hGH release. Additionally, sermorelin stimulates the pituitary to enhance hGH gene transcription, thereby maintaining the growth hormone neuroendocrine system axis, which is the first to deteriorate with age. By supporting pituitary function, sermorelin helps slow the decline of pituitary hormones during aging, thereby preserving both youthful anatomy and physiology.

== Research potential ==
GHRH naturally declines with age. No conclusive results are known whether sermorelin could yield potential benefits for adults, such as to enhance pituitary function or mimic growth hormone secretion patterns. Orally active growth hormone-releasing peptides may be under development. Sermorelin may be an alternative to rhGH for growth hormone replacement therapy (GHRT) in aging adults.

Sermorelin can be prescribed for off-label use without the legal restrictions that apply to rhGH.

== History ==
Sermorelin acetate was developed as a truncated synthetic analogue of growth hormone-releasing hormone (GHRH) during research into peptide-based regulation of the hypothalamic–pituitary axis in the late 20th century. It was introduced into clinical practice primarily as a diagnostic tool for evaluating growth hormone secretion in children with suspected growth hormone deficiency.

The compound gained regulatory approval in the United States in 1997 for diagnostic use, but its clinical adoption remained limited compared with other endocrine testing methods. In the early 2000s, its use declined as alternative diagnostic strategies and recombinant hormone assays became more widely available. Commercial production was discontinued in 2008 for non-safety-related business reasons, effectively removing it from the standard pharmaceutical market, although research interest in growth hormone-releasing peptides has continued.

== See also ==
- List of growth hormone secretagogues
