= OS-01 =

Chemical and physical data
- Formula: C_{55}H_{87}N_{15}O_{14}
- Molar mass: 1182.392 g·mol^{−1}
- 3D model (JSmol): Interactive image
- SMILES: OC(=O)[C@H](NC(=O)CNC(=O)[C@@H](NC(=O)[C@@H](NC(=O)[C@@H](NC(=O)[C@@H](NC(=O)[C@@H](NC(=O)[C@H](C)NC(=O)[C@H](NC(=O)[C@@H](N)CCC(O)=O)[C@H](O)C)CCCCN)Cc1nc[NH]c1)Cc1c[NH]c2ccccc21)CC(C)C)CCCCN)[C@@H](C)CC
- InChI: InChI=InChI=1S/C55H87N15O14/c1-7-30(4)45(55(83)84)69-43(72)27-61-49(77)38(16-10-12-20-56)65-51(79)40(22-29(2)3)66-52(80)41(23-33-25-60-37-15-9-8-14-35(33)37)67-53(81)42(24-34-26-59-28-62-34)68-50(78)39(17-11-13-21-57)64-47(75)31(5)63-54(82)46(32(6)71)70-48(76)36(58)18-19-44(73)74/h8-9,14-15,25-26,28-32,36,38-42,45-46,60,71H,7,10-13,16-24,27,56-58H2,1-6H3,(H,59,62)(H,61,77)(H,63,82)(H,64,75)(H,65,79)(H,66,80)(H,67,81)(H,68,78)(H,69,72)(H,70,76)(H,73,74)(H,83,84)/t30-,31-,32+,36-,38-,39-,40-,41-,42-,45-,46-/m0/s1; Key:ITRPLMIARFGDNH-ABPOXAFGSA-N

OS-01 (Peptide 14, Decapeptide 52) is a polypeptide ten amino acids in length from the matrikine group, developed by Oneskin Incorporated in Brazil for use in cosmetic skin creams. It was discovered by screening a library of 164 peptide fragments against cultured human dermal fibroblast cells from a donor with Hutchinson-Gilford Progeria Syndrome, to look for compounds which decreased expression of tissue factors associated with cellular senescence. Results in human trials are claimed to show anti-aging effects, though all trials published to date have been sponsored by the company which developed the compound. The peptide sequence was not stated in the published papers, but the associated patent from Oneskin claims Peptide 14 as ETAKHWLKGI or Glu–Thr–Ala–Lys–His–Trp–Leu–Lys–Gly–Ile.

== See also ==
- KPV tripeptide
- GHK-Cu
- Glycyl-prolyl-hydroxyproline
- Hexapeptide-10
- Hexapeptide-12
- Navitoclax
- Palmitoyl pentapeptide-4
- Palmitoyl Tripeptide-38
- Rapamycin
- Silk peptides
- Syn-AKE
- Tetrapeptide-21
- ZAG peptide
