= Matrikine =

Matrikines are a large and somewhat loosely defined group of peptides and small proteins, encompassing both endogenous signalling factors important in wound healing and tissue remodeling, and synthetically produced versions of these along with related analogues and derivatives, which are used mainly for cosmetic applications as well as for scientific research and with some medical indications.

== Classification ==
There are over 100 peptides which have been claimed as falling within this group, though most of them have relatively little published research and only a dozen or so such compounds are widely known and well characterised. Most compounds referred to as matrikines are synthetic versions of peptide fragments 2-6 amino acids in length which are found in connective tissue proteins such as collagen, elastin, fibronectin and laminin, and were originally isolated as products of the enzymatic hydrolysis of these proteins. Many of these form naturally in the body following injury or tissue damage, and act as signalling factors which trigger tissue repair processes. Larger protein fragments cleaved from the full length connective tissue proteins, such as arresten, canstatin and tumstatin, also have similar functions and may be grouped along with the smaller peptide matrikines. There are also other peptide fragments which are commonly included in the matrikine group on the basis of their similar activity, despite not being derived from connective tissue proteins.

== Function ==
Endogenous production of these peptides stimulates cells in the skin such as fibroblasts to synthesise more of the connective tissue proteins, and is claimed that administering the synthetic equivalent peptides can facilitate skin repair and wound healing and may have an anti-wrinkle and anti-aging effect. These peptides are administered topically as skin creams, or sometimes by subcutaneous injection or microneedling. Due to the poor absorption of even small peptides when administered topically to the skin, it is common for them to be conjugated with lipophilic chains such as palmitate or myristate to help them penetrate more deeply, though modern skin cream formulations often use more advanced techniques such as encapsulating them within liposomes which can achieve a similar effect. Matrikines are a diverse class of signalling peptides which do not all have the same spectrum of activity; certain members of the family such as hexapeptide-12 actually have a primarily pro-aging effect and are used in research into the aging process rather than as ingredients of anti-aging skin creams. Other matrikines can have anti-aging effects at low concentrations but promote carcinogenesis and tumor growth at higher levels, so appropriate dosage control is critical.

== Research and applications ==
Since matrikine peptides are used primarily for cosmetic applications which require only limited safety testing and have no requirement for proof of efficacy, much research into these peptides has been published in self-published sources such as patent applications, or in open-access journals which are generally regarded as low-quality sources due to the limited scope of peer review. This has meant that the claimed skin repair and anti-aging efficacy of these peptides has historically been treated with skepticism by the mainstream scientific community and regarded as marketing hype which has not been proven by rigorous scientific research. In recent years however, increasing evidence has accumulated to support the claimed activity of at least some of the matrikine peptides, along with investigation of these molecules for potential clinical applications such as treatment of arthritis and tendinopathy, and this has led medicines regulators in some jurisdictions such as Australia and New Zealand to view certain peptides from this group as medicines, and consequently ban them by classifying them as prescription medicines which are not actually available for prescription. In most parts of the world however these peptides are still classified as cosmetics and can be sold with relatively few restrictions, and they are widely used in countries such as Japan, China, South Korea, the United States and in Europe.

== Examples ==
Structure	Name	Amino acid sequence	PubChem	CAS #
	Acetyl hexapeptide-3	Ac-Glu-Glu-Met-Gln-Arg-Arg	11228338	616204-22-9
	Ac-SDKP	Ac-Ser-Asp-Lys-Pro	65938	120081-14-3
	GHK-Cu	Gly-His-Lys	342538	49557-75-7
	Glycyl-prolyl-hydroxyproline	Gly-Pro-Hyp	11778669	2239-67-0
	Hexapeptide-10	Ser-Ile-Lys-Val-Ala-Val	10145673	146439-94-3
	Hexapeptide-12	Val-Gly-Val-Ala-Pro-Gly	124934	92899-39-3
	KPV tripeptide	Lys-Pro-Val	125672	67727-97-3
	OS-01	Glu-Thr-Ala-Lys-His-Trp-Leu-Lys-Gly-Ile		
	Palmitoyl pentapeptide-4	Pal-Lys-Thr-Thr-Lys-Ser	9897237	214047-00-4
	Palmitoyl tetrapeptide-7	Pal-Gly-Gln-Pro-Arg	10078408	221227-05-0
	Palmitoyl Tripeptide-38	Pal-Lys-Met(O2)-Lys	71587932	1101448-24-1
	Tetrapeptide-21	Gly-Glu-Lys-Gly	42630677	960608-17-7
	Vesugen	Lys-Glu-Asp	87571363	204271-66-9

== See also ==
- BPC-157
- Decapaptide-12
- Epitalon
- Epidermal growth factor
- Hyaluronic acid
- Polydeoxyribonucleotide
- Silk peptides
- Syn-AKE
- TB-500
- ZAG peptide
