= Hexapeptide-10 =

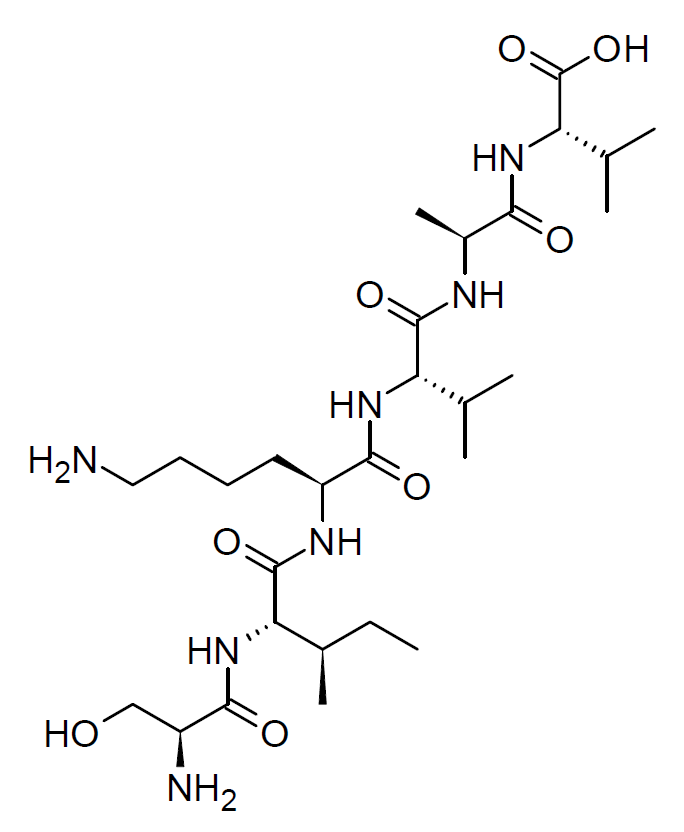

Identifiers
- IUPAC name: (2S)-2-[[(2S)-2-[[(2S)-2-[[(2S)-6-amino-2-[[(2S,3S)-2-[[(2S)-2-amino-3-hydroxypropanoyl]amino]-3-methylpentanoyl]amino]hexanoyl]amino]-3-methylbutanoyl]amino]propanoyl]amino]-3-methylbutanoic acid
- CAS Number: 146439-94-3
- PubChem CID: 10145673
- ChemSpider: 8321182
- UNII: W9RS1K7T9I

Chemical and physical data
- Formula: C_{28}H_{53}N_{7}O_{8}
- Molar mass: 615.773 g·mol^{−1}
- 3D model (JSmol): Interactive image
- SMILES: CC[C@H](C)[C@@H](C(=O)N[C@@H](CCCCN)C(=O)N[C@@H](C(C)C)C(=O)N[C@@H](C)C(=O)N[C@@H](C(C)C)C(=O)O)NC(=O)[C@H](CO)N
- InChI: InChI=1S/C28H53N7O8/c1-8-16(6)22(35-24(38)18(30)13-36)27(41)32-19(11-9-10-12-29)25(39)33-20(14(2)3)26(40)31-17(7)23(37)34-21(15(4)5)28(42)43/h14-22,36H,8-13,29-30H2,1-7H3,(H,31,40)(H,32,41)(H,33,39)(H,34,37)(H,35,38)(H,42,43)/t16-,17-,18-,19-,20-,21-,22-/m0/s1; Key:OFGVZFQUFJYSGS-CPDXTSBQSA-N

Hexapeptide-10 (SIKVAV, Serilesine) is a hexapeptide that is composed of a sequence Ser-Ile-Lys-Val-Ala-Val found at the C-terminus of the laminin α1 chain. Unlike other matrikine peptides which primarily act in the epidermis, hexapeptide-10 is active in deeper skin layers and promotes synthesis of laminin and integrin proteins, increases secretion of matrix metalloproteinases MMP2 and MMP9, and has angiogenic effects. Hexapeptide-10 promotes wound healing and tissue remodeling, and is used in skincare products with purported anti-aging effects. It has also been investigated for potential medical applications in the treatment of conditions such as Alzheimer's disease and muscular dystrophy. Due to its ability to promote angiogenesis, it can also promote tumour growth and is used in cancer research, though this requires concentrations many times higher than those used in skincare products.

== See also ==
- KPV tripeptide
- GHK-Cu
- Glycyl-prolyl-hydroxyproline
- Hexapeptide-12
- OS-01
- Palmitoyl pentapeptide-4
- Palmitoyl Tripeptide-38
- Silk peptides
- Tetrapeptide-21
