= ZAG peptide =

Chemical and physical data
- Formula: C_{165}H_{249}N_{41}O_{57}S
- Molar mass: 3751.10 g·mol^{−1}
- 3D model (JSmol): Interactive image
- SMILES: C[C@@H](CC)[C@@H](NC(=O)[C@H](CC(O)=O)NC(=O)[C@H](CCC(O)=O)NC(=O)[C@H](CCCNC(N)=N)NC(=O)[C@H](C)NC(=O)[C@H](CCCCN)NC(=O)[C@H](CCC(=O)N)NC(=O)[C@H](CC(C)C)NC(=O)[C@H](CCC(=O)N)NC(=O)[C@H](CO)NC(=O)[C@H](CC(=O)O)NC(=O)[C@H](CCC(=O)N)NC(=O)[C@H](CCCCN)NC(=O)[C@H](Cc1c[NH]c2ccccc21)NC(=O)[C@H](CC(=O)O)NC(=O)[C@@H](N)CCC(O)=O)C(=O)N[C@@H](Cc1ccccc1)C(=O)N[C@@H](CCSC)C(=O)N[C@@H](CCC(O)=O)C(=O)N[C@H]([C@H](O)C)C(=O)N[C@@H](CC(C)C)C(=O)N[C@@H](CCCCN)C(=O)N[C@@H](CC(O)=O)C(=O)N[C@H]([C@@H](C)CC)C(=O)N[C@@H](C(C)C)C(=O)N[C@@H](CCC(O)=O)C(=O)N[C@@H](Cc1ccc(O)cc1)C(=O)N[C@@H](Cc1ccc(O)cc1)C(=O)N[C@@H](CC(=O)N)C(=O)N[C@@H](CC(=O)O)C(=O)O

ZAG peptide is a polypeptide 30 amino acids in length, which consists of the sequence EDWKQDSQLQKAREDIFMETLKDIVEYYND or Glu-Asp-Trp-Lys-Gln-Asp-Ser-Gln-Leu-Gln-Lys-Ala-Arg-Glu-Asp-Ile-Phe-Met-Glu-Thr-Leu-Lys-Asp-Ile-Val-Glu-Tyr-Tyr-Asn-Asp.

ZAG peptide is a fragment derived from the 41 kDa protein Zinc-alpha-2-glycoprotein (ZAG) which is secreted by adipocytes and is involved in tissue growth and repair pathways. ZAG peptide has been researched for cosmetic use and is claimed to reduce the appearance of scars and UV damaged skin.

== See also ==
- KPV tripeptide
- GHK-Cu
- Glycyl-prolyl-hydroxyproline
- Matrikine
- OS-01
- Polydeoxyribonucleotide
- Silk peptides
