= Cream =

Dairy product

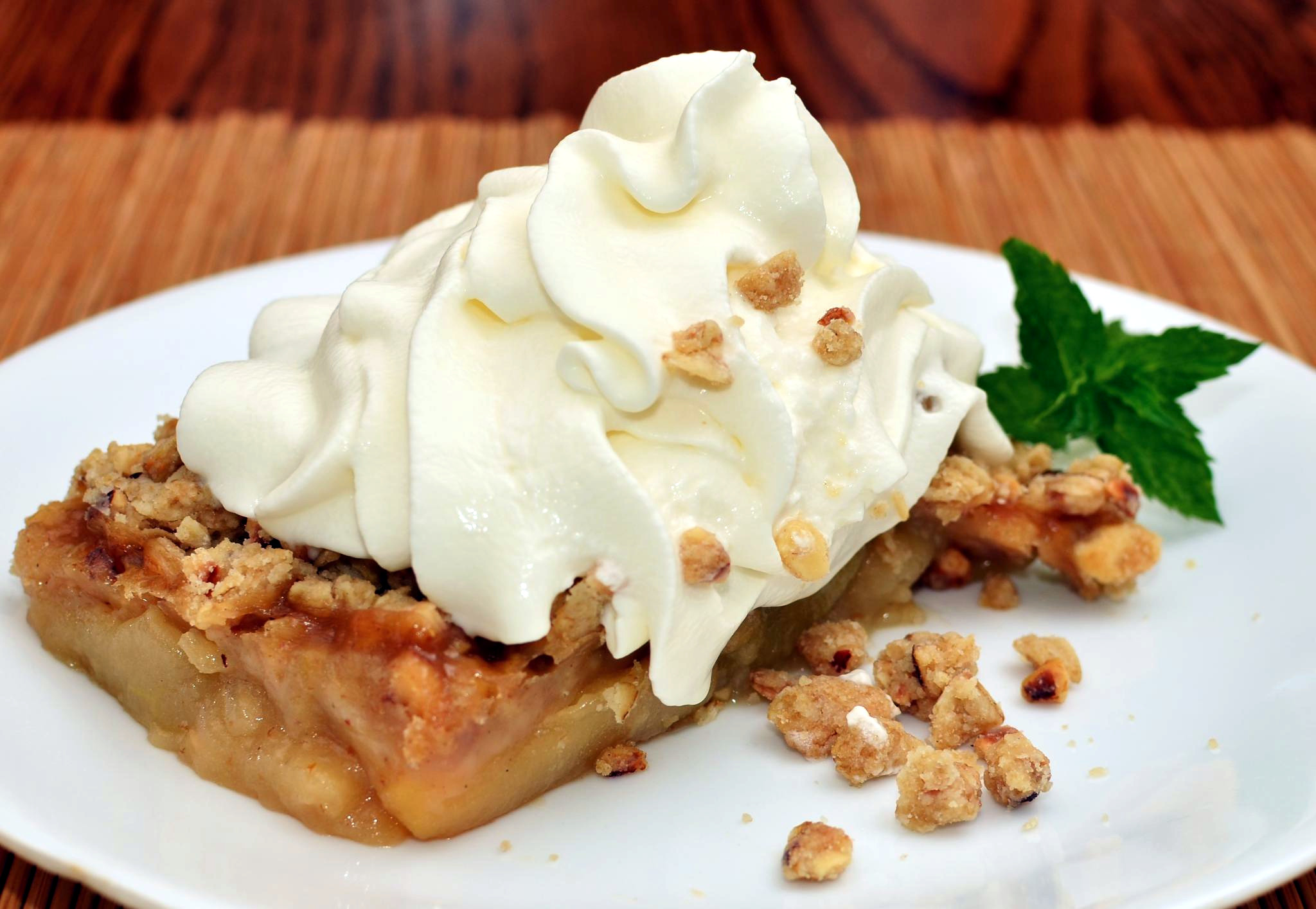
- Whipped cream on top of apple crisp

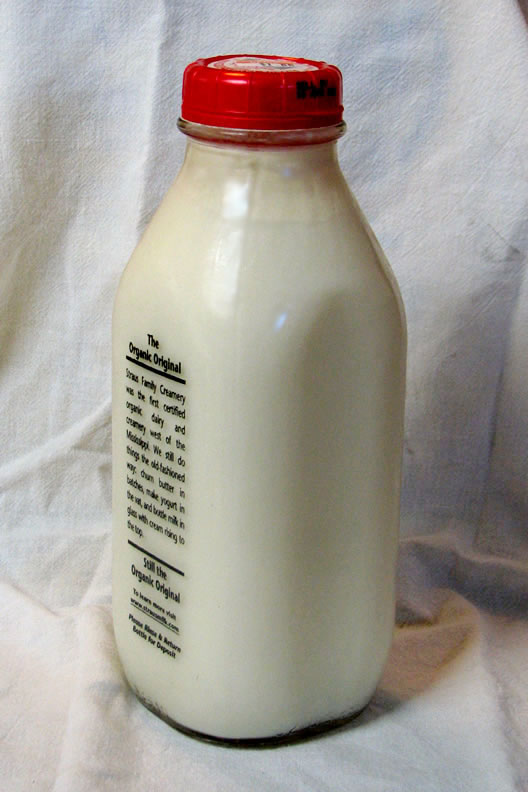
A bottle of unhomogenised milk, with the cream clearly visible, resting on top of the milk

Cream is a dairy product composed of the higher-fat layer skimmed from the top of milk before homogenization. The butterfat, which is less dense, rises to the top and is skimmed off, resulting in gravity cream. The industrial production of cream instead uses centrifugal separators to make separator cream. Cream is often sold in grades defined by their butterfat content. It contains high levels of saturated fat, in ascending proportion from light cream to heavy cream.

Cream skimmed from milk may be called "sweet cream" to distinguish it from cream skimmed from whey, a by-product of cheese-making. Whey cream has a lower fat content and tastes more salty, tangy, and "cheesy". In many countries, partially fermented cream is also sold as sour cream, crème fraîche, and so on. Both forms have many culinary uses in both sweet and savoury dishes.

Cream produced by cattle (particularly Jersey cattle) grazing on natural pasture often contains some fat-soluble carotenoid pigments derived from the plants they eat; traces of these intensely coloured pigments concentrated during separation give cream a slightly yellow hue, hence the name of the yellow-tinged off-white colour cream. Carotenoids are also the origin of butter's yellow colour. Cream from goat's milk, water buffalo milk, or from cows fed indoors on grain or grain-based pellets, is white.

Dehydrated cream is cream powder.

== Cuisine ==
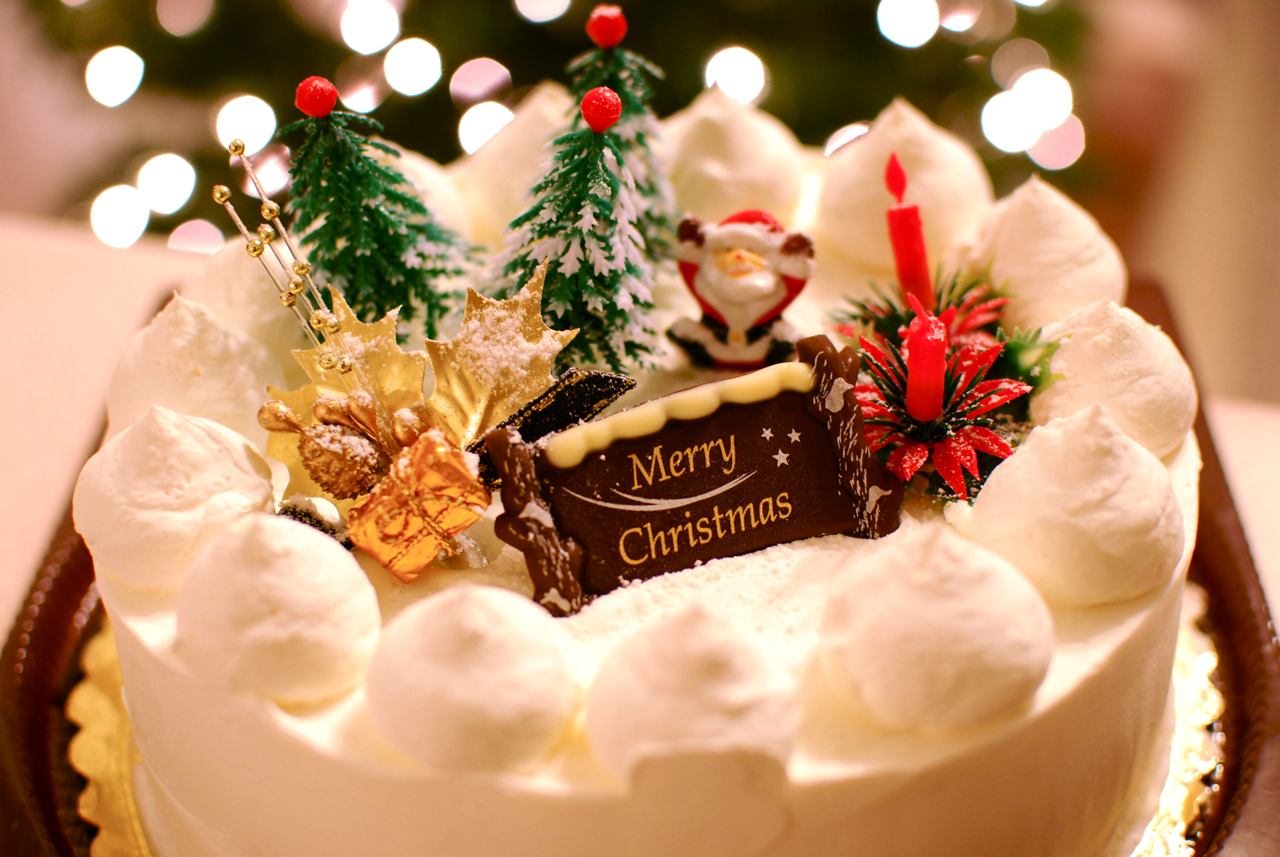
Christmas cake covered with whipped cream

Cream is used as an ingredient in many foods, including ice cream, many sauces, soups, stews, puddings, and some custard bases, and is also used for cakes. Whipped cream is served as a topping on ice cream sundaes, milkshakes, lassi, eggnog, sweet pies, strawberries, blueberries, or peaches. Cream is also used in Indian curries such as masala dishes. Both single and double cream (see Types for definitions) can be used in cooking. Double cream or full-fat crème fraîche is often used when the cream is added to a hot sauce, to prevent it separating or "splitting". Double cream can be thinned with milk to make an approximation of single cream.

Cream (usually light/single cream or half and half) may be added to coffee.

The French word crème denotes not only dairy cream but also other thick liquids such as sweet and savory custards, which are normally made with milk, not cream.

== Types ==
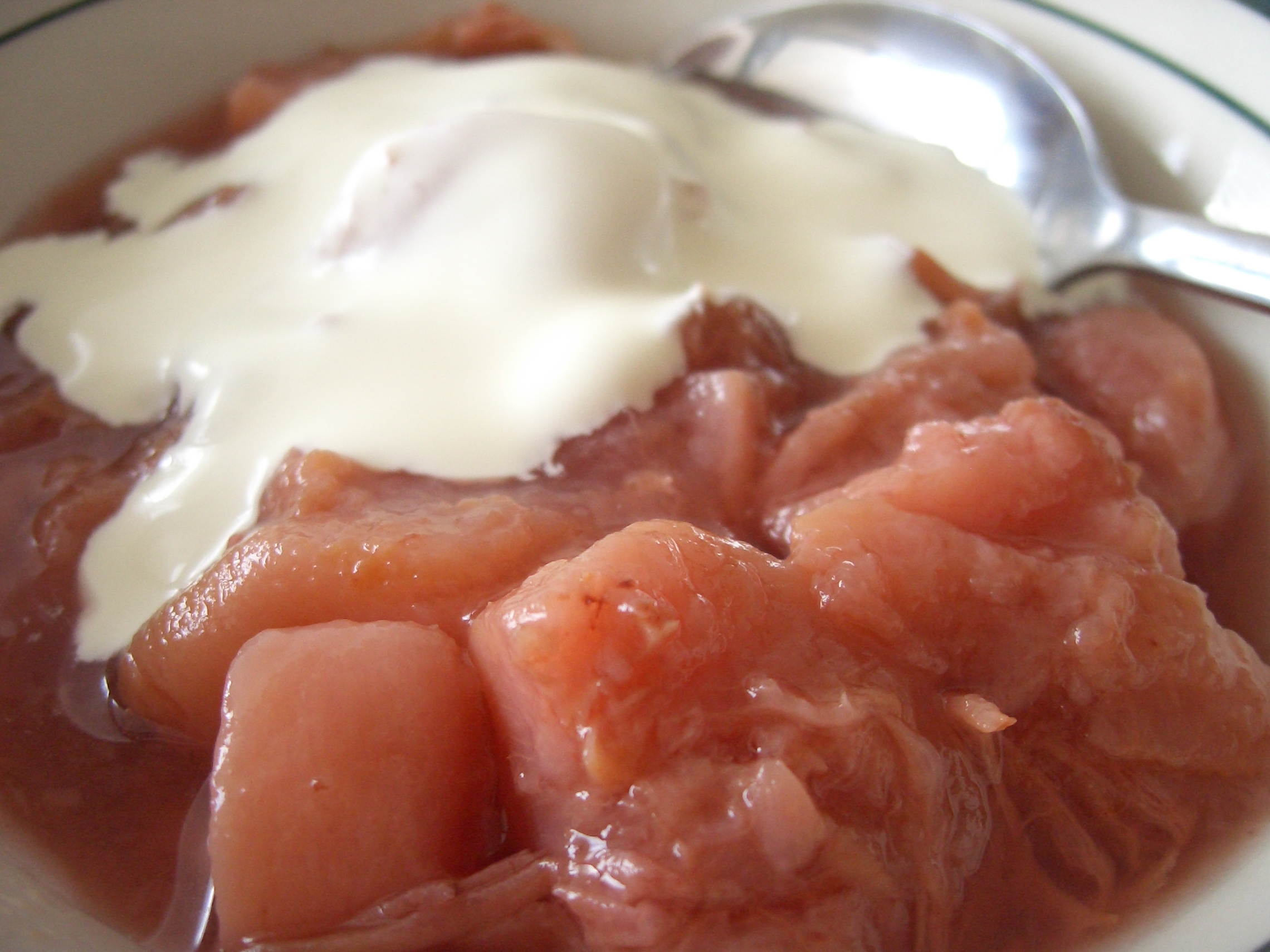
Stewed nectarines and heavy cream

Different grades of cream are distinguished by their fat content, whether they have been heat-treated, whipped, and so on. In many jurisdictions, there are regulations for each type.

=== Australia and New Zealand ===
The Australia New Zealand Food Standards Code – Standard 2.5.2 – Defines cream as a milk product comparatively rich in fat, in the form of an emulsion of fat-in-skim milk, which can be obtained by separation from milk. Cream sold without further specification must contain no less than 350 g/kg (35%) milk fat.

Manufacturers labels may distinguish between different fat contents, a general guideline is as follows:

Name	Fat content %	Main uses
Extra light (or 'lite')	12–12.5	
Light (or 'lite')	18–20	
Thickened cream	35–36.5	Cream with added gelatine or other thickeners to give the cream a thicker texture, also possibly with stabilisers to aid the consistency of whipped cream. Such cream would not typically be used for cooking.
Cream	≥ 35	Recipes calling for cream are usually referring to pure cream with about 35% fat. This is used for cooking as well as for pouring and whipping. It is comparable to whipping cream in some other countries.
Double cream	48–60	

=== Canada ===
Canadian cream definitions are similar to those used in the United States, except for "light cream", which is very low-fat cream, usually with 5 or 6 percent butterfat. Specific product characteristics are generally uniform throughout Canada, but names vary by both geographic and linguistic area and by manufacturer: "coffee cream" may be 10 or 18 percent cream and "half-and-half" (crème légère) may be 3, 5, 6 or 10 percent, all depending on location and brand.

Regulations allow cream to contain acidity regulators and stabilizers. For whipping cream, allowed additives include skim milk powder (≤ 0.25%), glucose solids (≤ 0.1%), calcium sulphate (≤ 0.005%), and xanthan gum (≤ 0.02%). The content of milk fat in canned cream must be displayed as a percentage followed by "milk fat", "B.F", or "M.F".

Name	Minimum milk fat %	Additional definition	Main uses
Manufacturing cream	40	Crème fraîche is also 40–45% but is an acidified cultured product rather than sweet cream.	Commercial production.
Whipping cream	33–36	Also as cooking or "thick" cream 35% with added stabilizers. Heavy cream must be at least 36%. In Francophone areas: crème à fouetter 35%; and for cooking, crème à cuisson 35%, crème à l'ancienne 35% or crème épaisse 35%.	Whips into a creamy and smooth topping that is used for pastries, fresh fruits, desserts, hot cocoa, etc. Cooking version is formulated to resist breaking when heated (as in sauces).
Table cream/Coffee cream	15–18	Coffee cream. Also as cooking or "thick" cream 15% with added stabilizers. In Francophone areas: crème de table 15% or crème à café 18%; and for cooking, crème champêtre 15%, crème campagnarde (country cream) 15% or crème épaisse 15%.	Added as rich whitener to coffee. Ideal for soups, sauces and veloutés. Garnishing fruit and desserts. Cooking version is formulated to resist breaking when heated.
Half and half/Blend cream	10	Cereal cream. Product with the most butterfat in the light cream category. In Francophone areas: crème à café 10% and sometimes crème légère 10%. Approximately equal to a 50/50 blend of table cream (at 16–18%) and whole milk (at 3.25%), hence the common name in English.	Poured over hot cereal as a garnish. Ideal in sauces for vegetables, fish, meat, poultry, and pasta. Also in cream soups.
Light cream	3–10	Light cream 6%. In Francophone areas: mélange de lait et de crème pour café 5%, Crémette™ 5% or crème légère 3% to 10%. A mixture of milk and cream.	5% product is similar to the richest Guernsey or Jersey milk. A lower fat alternative to table cream in coffee.

=== France ===
In France, the use of the term "cream" for food products is defined by the decree 80-313 of April 23, 1980. It specifies the minimum rate of milk fat (12%) as well as the rules for pasteurisation or UHT sterilisation. The mention "crème fraîche" (fresh cream) can only be used for pasteurised creams conditioned on production site within 24h after pasteurisation. Even if food additives complying with French and European laws are allowed, usually, none will be found in plain "crèmes" and "crèmes fraîches" apart from lactic ferments (some low cost creams (or close to creams) can contain thickening agents, but rarely). Fat content is commonly shown as "XX% M.G." ("matière grasse").

Name	Milk fat %	Definition	Main uses
Without lactic ferments added (liquid texture)
Crème fraîche crue	30-40	Directly from the farm production. Local food circuits. No sterilisation and no pasteurisation.	
Crème fleurette	30	No sterilisation but pasteurised. Liquid and soft the first days, it gets heavier and develops a more pronounced taste with time.	Commonly used by cooks in restaurants.
Crème entière liquide	22-40	UHT sterilised (in France, a cream can not legally be called "fraîche" if it has been UHT sterilised).	
Crème fraîche liquide:	30-40 (usually 30%)	Pasteurised (can be called "fraîche").	Mostly used for fruit desserts and to make crème chantilly or ganaches. Can also be used to make white sauces or added in soups or pastas.
Crème fraîche légère liquide	12-21 (usually 15)	Pasteurised (can be called "fraîche"). Less fat.	Can be used for the same recipes as the non diet one but sometimes considered as less tasty or less convenient to cook with.
With lactic ferments added (heavy texture)
Crème crue maturée	30-40	Directly from the farm production. Local food circuits. No sterilisation and no pasteurisation.	
Crème entière épaisse	22-40	UHT sterilised (in France, a cream can not legally be called "fraîche" if it has been UHT sterilised).	
Crème fraîche épaisse	30-40 (usually 30)	Pasteurised (can be called "fraîche").	Suits best for cooking especially reductions and liaisons (used as a binding agent). Also used to cook quiches (such as quiche Lorraine).
Crème fraîche légère épaisse	12-21 (usually 15)	Pasteurised (can be called "fraîche"). Less fat.	Can be used for the same recipes as the non diet one but sometimes considered as less tasty or less convenient to cook with.
Crème aigre	16-21	More acidic taste.	Same product as the American sour cream or the Canadian crème sure, but rarely used in France.

=== Russia ===
Russia, as well as other EAC countries, legally separates cream into two classes: normal (10–34% butterfat) and heavy (35–58%), but the industry has pretty much standardized around the following types:

English	Russian	Transliteration	Milk fat (wt%)
Low-fat or drinking cream	Нежирные (питьевые) сливки	Nezhirnÿe (pityevÿe) slivki	10%
(Normal) Cream	Сливки	Slivki	15–20
Whipping cream	Сливки для взбивания	Slivki dlya vzbivaniya	33–35
Double cream	Двойные (жирные) сливки	Dvoinÿe (Zhirnÿe) slivki	48

=== Sweden ===
In Sweden, cream is usually sold as:

- Matlagningsgrädde ("cooking cream"), 10–15%
- Kaffegrädde ("Coffee cream"), 10–12%, earlier mostly 12%
- Vispgrädde (whipping cream), 36–40%, the 36% variant often has additives.

Mellangrädde (27%) is, nowadays, a less common variant. Gräddfil (usually 12%) and Creme Fraiche (usually around 35%) are two common sour cream products.

=== Switzerland ===
In Switzerland, the types of cream are legally defined as follows:

English	German	French	Italian	Typical milk fat wt%	Minimum milk fat wt%
Double cream	Doppelrahm	double-crème	doppia panna	45	45
Full cream Whipping cream Cream	Vollrahm; Schlagrahm; Rahm/Sahne	crème entière crème à fouetter crème	panna intera panna da montare panna	35	35
Half cream	Halbrahm	demi-crème	mezza panna	25	15
Coffee cream	Kaffeerahm	crème à café	panna da caffè	15	15

Sour cream and crème fraîche (German: Sauerrahm, Crème fraîche; French: crème acidulée, crème fraîche; Italian: panna acidula, crème fraîche) are defined as cream soured by bacterial cultures.

Thick cream (German: verdickter Rahm; French: crème épaissie; Italian: panna addensata) is defined as cream thickened using thickening agents.

=== United Kingdom ===
In the United Kingdom, these types of cream are produced. Fat content must meet the Food Labelling Regulations 1996.

Name	Minimum milk fat	Additional definition	Main uses
Clotted cream	55	is clotted (by heat treatment)	Clotted cream is the thickest cream available and a traditional part of a cream tea and is spread onto scones like butter.
Extra-thick double cream	48	is heat-treated, then quickly cooled	Extra-thick double cream is the second thickest cream available. It is spooned onto pies, puddings, and desserts due to its heavy consistency.
Double cream	48		Double cream whips easily and produces heavy whipped cream for puddings and desserts.
Whipping cream	35		Whipping cream whips well and produces lighter whipped cream than double cream.
Whipped cream	35	has been whipped	Whipped cream is typically used for decorating cakes, as a topping on desserts, or as an accompaniment with fresh fruit.
Sterilized cream	23	is sterilized	
Single cream	18	is not sterilized	Single cream is poured over puddings, used in sauces, and added to coffee.
Extra-thick single cream	18	not sterilized; homogenised for consistency like double cream	
Sterilized half cream	12	is sterilized	
Half cream	12		Uncommon. Used in some cocktails.

=== United States ===
In the United States, cream is usually sold as:

Name	Fat content	Main uses
Half and half	10.5-18	Half and half is equal parts milk and light cream, and is added to coffee.
Light cream	18–30	Light cream is added to coffee and hot cereal, and is also used as an ingredient in sauces and other recipes.
Whipping cream	30–36	Whipping cream is used in sauces and soups, and as a garnish. Whipping cream will only produce whipped cream with soft peaks.
Heavy (whipping) cream	36+	Heavy whipping cream produces whipped cream with stable peaks.
Manufacturer's cream	36-40	Used in commercial and professional production applications. Not generally available at retail.

Not all grades are defined by all jurisdictions, and the exact fat content ranges vary. The above figures, except for "manufacturer's cream", are based on the Code of Federal Regulations, Title 21, Part 131.

== Cream powder ==
Cream powder made from dehydrated sweet cream is widely used industrially, and, under the name heavy cream powder, as a lightweight coffee whitener not requiring refrigeration.

== Processing and additives ==
Cream may have thickening agents and stabilizers added. Thickeners include sodium alginate, carrageenan, gelatine, sodium bicarbonate, tetrasodium pyrophosphate, and alginic acid.

Other processing may be carried out. For example, cream has a tendency to produce oily globules (called "feathering") when added to coffee. The stability of the cream may be increased by increasing the non-fat solids content, which can be done by partial demineralisation and addition of sodium caseinate, although this is expensive.

== Other cream products ==
Chart of 50 types of milk products and relationships, including cream (click on image to enlarge)

- Butter is made by churning cream to separate the butterfat and buttermilk. This can be done by hand or by machine.
- Whipped cream is made by whisking or mixing air into cream with more than 30% fat, to turn the liquid cream into a soft solid. Nitrous oxide, from whipped-cream chargers may also be used to make whipped cream.
- Sour cream, produced in many countries, is cream (12 to 16% or more milk fat) that has been subjected to a bacterial culture that produces lactic acid (0.5%+), which sours and thickens it.
- Crème fraîche (28% milk fat) is slightly soured with bacterial culture, but not as sour or as thick as sour cream. Mexican crema (or cream espesa) is similar to crème fraîche.
- Smetana is a heavy cream-derived (15–40% milk fat) Central and Eastern European sweet or sour cream.
- Rjome or rømme is Norwegian sour cream containing 35% milk fat, similar to Icelandic sýrður rjómi.
- Clotted cream in the United Kingdom is made through a process that starts by slowly heating whole milk to produce a very high-fat (55%) product, similar to Indian malai.
- Reduced cream is a cream product in New Zealand, often used to make Kiwi dip.

== Other items called "cream" ==
Some non-edible substances are called creams due to their consistency: shoe cream is runny, unlike regular waxy shoe polish; hand/body "creme" or "skin cream" is meant for moisturizing the skin. Some other examples are shaving cream, hair cream.

Regulations in many jurisdictions restrict the use of the word cream for foods. Words such as creme, kreme, creame, or whipped topping (e.g., Cool Whip) are often used for products which cannot legally be called cream, though in some jurisdictions even these spellings may be disallowed, for example under the doctrine of idem sonans. Oreo and Hydrox cookies are a type of sandwich cookie in which two biscuits have a soft, sweet filling between them that is called "crème filling." In some cases, foods can be described as cream although they do not contain predominantly milk fats; for example, in Britain, "ice cream" can contain non-milk fat (declared on the label) in addition to or instead of cream, and salad cream is the customary name for a non-dairy condiment that has been produced since the 1920s.

In other languages, cognates of "cream" are also sometimes used for non-food products, such as fogkrém (Hungarian for toothpaste), or Sonnencreme (German for sunscreen).

Some products are described as "cream alternatives". For example, Elmlea Double, etc. are blends of buttermilk or lentils and vegetable oil with other additives sold by Upfield in the United Kingdom packaged and shelved in the same way as cream, labelled as having "a creamy taste".

== See also ==
- Creaming (chemistry)
- Buttercream
- Condensed milk
- Crème, a French culinary term for cream-like preparations
  - Crème liqueur
- Ice cream
- Kaymak, which is similar to clotted cream
- List of cream soups
- Milk skin
- Plant cream
