= Syn-AKE =

Identifiers
- IUPAC name: (2S)-N-[(2S)-4-amino-1-(benzylamino)-1-oxobutan-2-yl]-1-(3-aminopropanoyl)pyrrolidine-2-carboxamide
- CAS Number: 823202-98-8 823202-99-9 (diacetate salt)
- PubChem CID: 59499763
- ChemSpider: 32700556
- UNII: O0FY926GMK
- CompTox Dashboard (EPA): DTXSID80231698

Chemical and physical data
- Formula: C_{19}H_{29}N_{5}O_{3}
- Molar mass: 375.473 g·mol^{−1}
- 3D model (JSmol): Interactive image
- SMILES: C1C[C@H](N(C1)C(=O)CCN)C(=O)N[C@@H](CCN)C(=O)NCC2=CC=CC=C2
- InChI: InChI=1S/C19H29N5O3/c20-10-8-15(18(26)22-13-14-5-2-1-3-6-14)23-19(27)16-7-4-12-24(16)17(25)9-11-21/h1-3,5-6,15-16H,4,7-13,20-21H2,(H,22,26)(H,23,27)/t15-,16-/m0/s1; Key:CTUFKZFWHRPQEC-HOTGVXAUSA-N

Syn-AKE (Dipeptide diaminobutyroyl benzylamide, βAla-Pro-Dab-NHBn) is a peptide developed by the Swedish company Pentapharm for use in cosmetic skin creams. It is a modified tripeptide fragment derived from the larger polypeptide Waglerin-1, which is a component of the venom from Wagler's pit viper, Tropidolaemus wagleri. Both Waglerin-1 and Syn-AKE act as antagonists of nicotinic acetylcholine receptors and when applied topically can temporarily reduce the appearance of fine lines and wrinkles by paralysis of facial muscles, in a similar manner to Botox but with a reversible, short term effect and without requiring injection into the skin. The intact Waglerin-1 peptide has also been used in skin creams, but Syn-AKE is a much smaller peptide which is better absorbed into the skin, and has reduced potential for systemic toxicity and resulting side effects.

== See also ==
- Argireline
- KPV tripeptide
- GHK-Cu
- Matrikine
- OS-01
