= AHK-Cu =

Identifiers
- IUPAC name: (S)-6-amino-2-((S)-2-((S)-2-aminopropanamido)-3-(1H-imidazol-5-yl)propanamido)hexanoic acid, copper salt
- CAS Number: 126828-32-8
- PubChem CID: 7408502

Chemical and physical data
- Formula: C_{15}H_{26}CuN_{6}O_{4}
- Molar mass: 417.957 g·mol^{−1}
- 3D model (JSmol): Interactive image
- SMILES: [C@H](C(N[C@@H](CCCCN)C(O)=O)=O)(NC([C@H](C)N)=O)CC1=CN=CN1.[Cu]
- InChI: InChI=InChI=1S/C15H26N6O4.Cu/c1-9(17)13(22)21-12(6-10-7-18-8-19-10)14(23)20-11(15(24)25)4-2-3-5-16;/h7-9,11-12H,2-6,16-17H2,1H3,(H,18,19)(H,20,23)(H,21,22)(H,24,25);/t9-,11-,12-;/m0./s1; Key:VCOZNHBYVAERRL-LBRAPMIBSA-N

AHK-Cu (Ala-His-Lys, Tripeptide-3) is a synthetic tripeptide derivative closely related to the endogenous signalling factor GHK-Cu. Like GHK-Cu, it binds to copper ions with high affinity and is claimed to possess similar effects in modulating tissue repair processes. However, AHK-Cu is claimed to show more specific activity in dermal papilla cells, which are important in the morphogenesis and growth of hair follicles. Despite the theoretical basis, there is no evidence to show that AHK-Cu is effective in stimulating hair regrowth in humans.

== See also ==
- GPE
- Glycyl-prolyl-hydroxyproline
- KPV tripeptide
- SVT-NH-ethyl
