= Hexapeptide-12 =

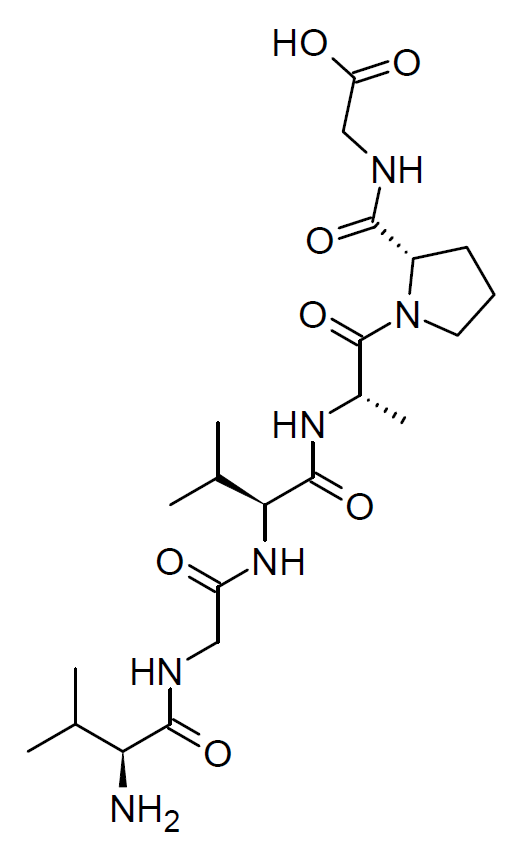

Identifiers
- IUPAC name: 2-[[(2S)-1-[(2S)-2-[[(2S)-2-[[2-[[(2S)-2-amino-3-methylbutanoyl]amino]acetyl]amino]-3-methylbutanoyl]amino]propanoyl]pyrrolidine-2-carbonyl]amino]acetic acid
- CAS Number: 92899-39-3
- PubChem CID: 124934
- ChemSpider: 111231
- UNII: 04V1QPJ5TW
- CompTox Dashboard (EPA): DTXSID50918909

Chemical and physical data
- Formula: C_{22}H_{38}N_{6}O_{7}
- Molar mass: 498.581 g·mol^{−1}
- 3D model (JSmol): Interactive image
- SMILES: C[C@@H](C(=O)N1CCC[C@H]1C(=O)NCC(=O)O)NC(=O)[C@H](C(C)C)NC(=O)CNC(=O)[C@H](C(C)C)N
- InChI: InChI=1S/C22H38N6O7/c1-11(2)17(23)20(33)24-9-15(29)27-18(12(3)4)21(34)26-13(5)22(35)28-8-6-7-14(28)19(32)25-10-16(30)31/h11-14,17-18H,6-10,23H2,1-5H3,(H,24,33)(H,25,32)(H,26,34)(H,27,29)(H,30,31)/t13-,14-,17-,18-/m0/s1; Key:RLCSROTYKMPBDL-USJZOSNVSA-N

Hexapeptide-12 (Elastin hexapeptide) is a hexapeptide with the sequence VGVAPG, which is derived from a sequence found in the connective tissue protein elastin. At low concentrations it can stimulate biosynthesis of elastin and also inhibits production of the inflammatory signalling protein interleukin-6, which gives it an additional antiinflammatory effect. However, at higher concentrations VGVAPG upregulates Sirtuin 2 expression which has a pro-aging and neurodegenerative effect, and progressive build-up of VGVAPG levels from degradation of elastin is thought to be an important contributor to the aging process, so VGVAPG is mainly used in research applications into the pro-aging effects of some matrikine peptides, rather than being used as an ingredient in skincare products as with other related compounds.

== See also ==
- Glycyl-prolyl-hydroxyproline
- Hexapeptide-10
- Tetrapeptide-21
