= Tetrapeptide-21 =

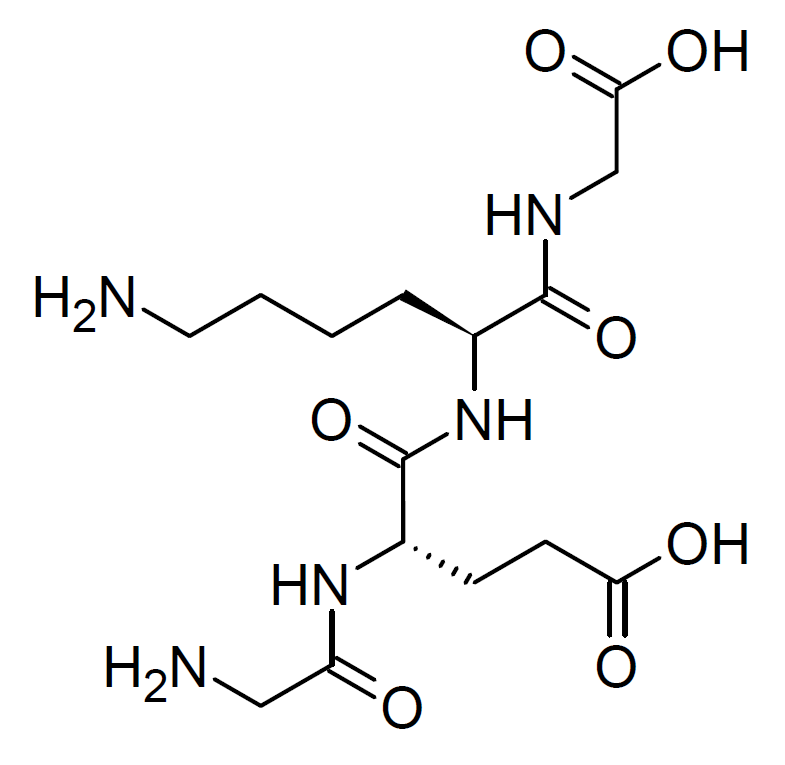

Identifiers
- IUPAC name: (4S)-4-[(2-aminoacetyl)amino]-5-[[(2S)-6-amino-1-(carboxymethylamino)-1-oxohexan-2-yl]amino]-5-oxopentanoic acid
- CAS Number: 960608-17-7
- PubChem CID: 42630677
- ChemSpider: 32698920
- UNII: 179JUC43HU
- CompTox Dashboard (EPA): DTXSID80242108

Chemical and physical data
- Formula: C_{15}H_{27}N_{5}O_{7}
- Molar mass: 389.409 g·mol^{−1}
- 3D model (JSmol): Interactive image
- SMILES: C(CCN)C[C@@H](C(=O)NCC(=O)O)NC(=O)[C@H](CCC(=O)O)NC(=O)CN
- InChI: InChI=1S/C15H27N5O7/c16-6-2-1-3-9(14(26)18-8-13(24)25)20-15(27)10(4-5-12(22)23)19-11(21)7-17/h9-10H,1-8,16-17H2,(H,18,26)(H,19,21)(H,20,27)(H,22,23)(H,24,25)/t9-,10-/m0/s1; Key:CUVSTAMIHSSVKL-UWVGGRQHSA-N

Tetrapeptide-21 (GEKG peptide) is a tetrapeptide that is derived from a sequence found in connective tissue proteins such as collagens and elastin. It stimulates endogenous biosynthesis of collagens, fibronectin and hyaluronic acid, and is used in skincare products for its purported anti-aging effects.

== See also ==
- KPV tripeptide
- GHK-Cu
- Glycyl-prolyl-hydroxyproline
- Hexapeptide-10
- Palmitoyl pentapeptide-4
- Palmitoyl Tripeptide-38
- Silk peptides
