= Palmitoyl tetrapeptide-7 =

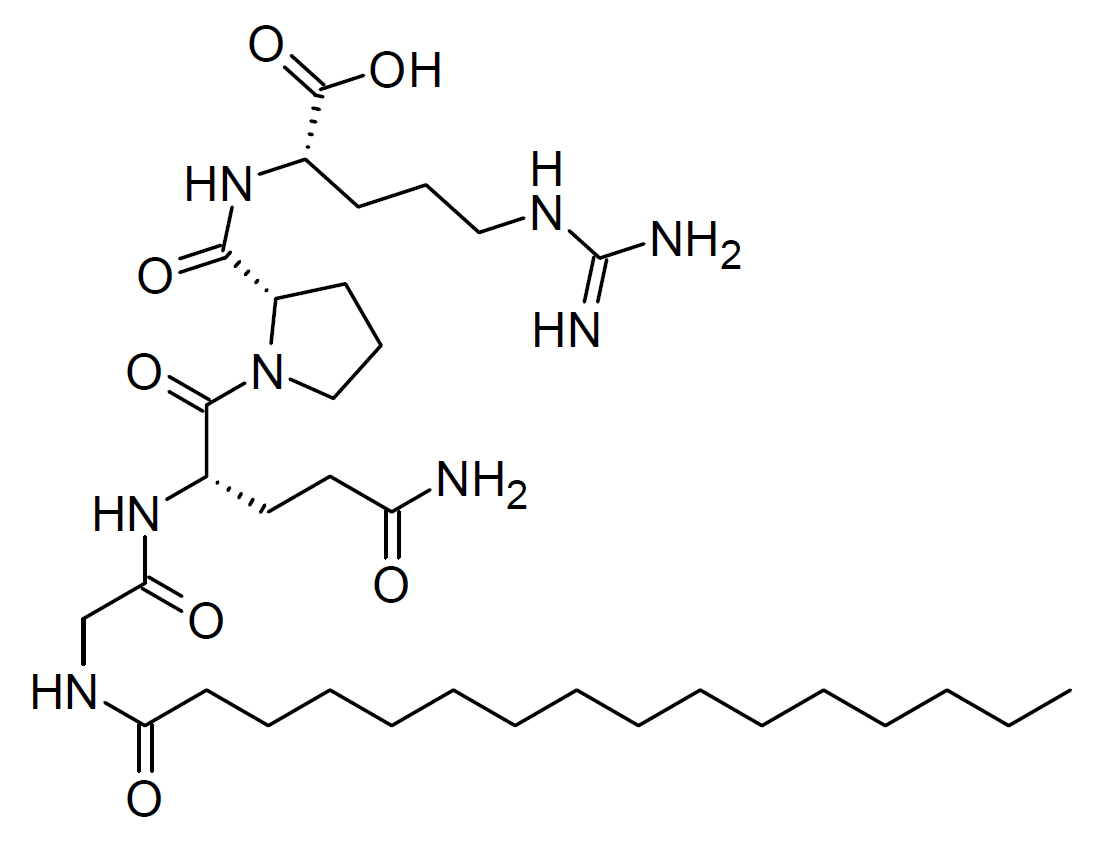

Identifiers
- IUPAC name: (2S)-2-[[(2S)-1-[(2S)-5-amino-2-[[2-(hexadecanoylamino)acetyl]amino]-5-oxopentanoyl]pyrrolidine-2-carbonyl]amino]-5-(diaminomethylideneamino)pentanoic acid
- CAS Number: 221227-05-0
- PubChem CID: 10078408
- DrugBank: DB14137
- ChemSpider: 8253946
- UNII: Q41S464P1R
- CompTox Dashboard (EPA): DTXSID10176644

Chemical and physical data
- Formula: C_{34}H_{62}N_{8}O_{7}
- Molar mass: 694.919 g·mol^{−1}
- 3D model (JSmol): Interactive image
- SMILES: CCCCCCCCCCCCCCCC(=O)NCC(=O)N[C@@H](CCC(=O)N)C(=O)N1CCC[C@H]1C(=O)N[C@@H](CCCN=C(N)N)C(=O)O
- InChI: InChI=1S/C34H62N8O7/c1-2-3-4-5-6-7-8-9-10-11-12-13-14-19-29(44)39-24-30(45)40-25(20-21-28(35)43)32(47)42-23-16-18-27(42)31(46)41-26(33(48)49)17-15-22-38-34(36)37/h25-27H,2-24H2,1H3,(H2,35,43)(H,39,44)(H,40,45)(H,41,46)(H,48,49)(H4,36,37,38)/t25-,26-,27-/m0/s1; Key:IHRKJQSLKLYWBQ-QKDODKLFSA-N

Palmitoyl tetrapeptide-7 (Pal-GQPR) is a tetrapeptide that is derived from an amino acid sequence Gly-Gln-Pro-Arg found in the immune system modulator immunoglobulin G, conjugated with a lipophilic palmitoyl chain to enhance skin absorption. Even though it is not derived from connective tissue proteins, it is commonly grouped with the matrikine peptides as it has similar effects in the body in promoting synthesis of collagen, and is claimed to produce anti-aging and anti-wrinkle effects. It also has an additional antiinflammatory action due to inhibition of interleukin 6 production and is used in skin creams.

== See also ==
- Palmitoyl pentapeptide-4
- Palmitoyl Tripeptide-38
