= French onion dip =

American dip flavored with onion

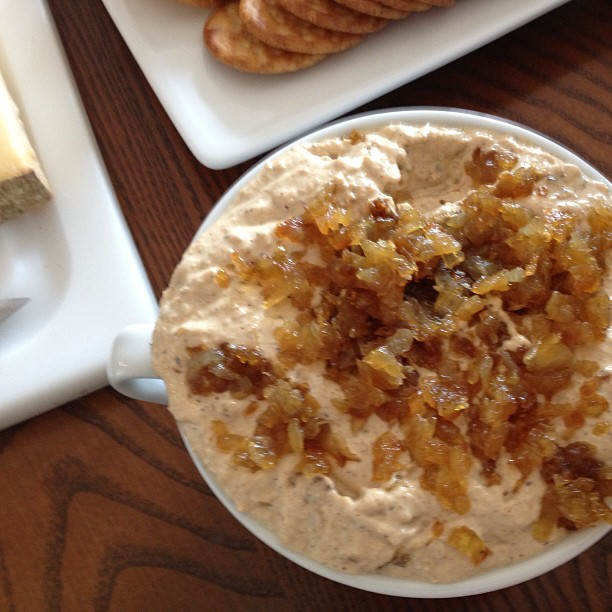
- Homemade French onion dip topped with caramelized onion
- Alternative names: California dip
- Type: Dip
- Place of origin: United States
- Invented: 1954
- Main ingredients: Sour cream, minced onion

French onion dip or California dip is an American dip typically made with a base of sour cream and flavored with minced onion, and usually served with potato chips as chips and dip. It is also served with snack crackers and crudités. It is not French cuisine; it is called "French" because it is made with dehydrated French onion soup mix.

== History ==
French onion dip, made of sour cream and instant onion soup, was created by an unknown cook in Los Angeles in 1954. The recipe spread quickly and was printed in a local newspaper. The Lipton company promoted the recipe on the television show Arthur Godfrey's Talent Scouts in 1955, and early on, it was known as "Lipton California Dip", but soon simply as "California Dip". A Lipton advertising campaign promoted it on television and in supermarkets. The recipe was added to the Lipton instant onion soup package in 1958.

Around the same time, a similar recipe, but made with reduced cream, was created in New Zealand and became very popular.

The name "French onion dip" began to be used in the 1960s, and gradually replaced "California dip".

== Preparation ==
The original recipe consisted of sour cream and dehydrated onion soup mix.

There are now many mass-produced, pre-mixed versions, such as Ruffles French Onion Dip and Frito-Lay French Onion Dip. Commercially prepared products include additional ingredients to thicken, stabilize, and preserve the mixture.

Home-made versions may use caramelized onions.

== Serving ==
French onion dip is often served at parties and as a "classic holiday party offering". It has also been described as "an American classic".

It may also be used on other foods, such as hamburgers, sandwiches and tacos.

== Variants ==
Alternative bases include cream cheese and mayonnaise. Common flavorings are salt, pepper, onion powder, garlic, garlic powder, parsley, chives, Worcestershire sauce pepper sauce and others.

== See also ==
- Clam dip
- Kiwi onion dip
- List of dips
