= AZGP1 =

Protein-coding gene in the species Homo sapiens

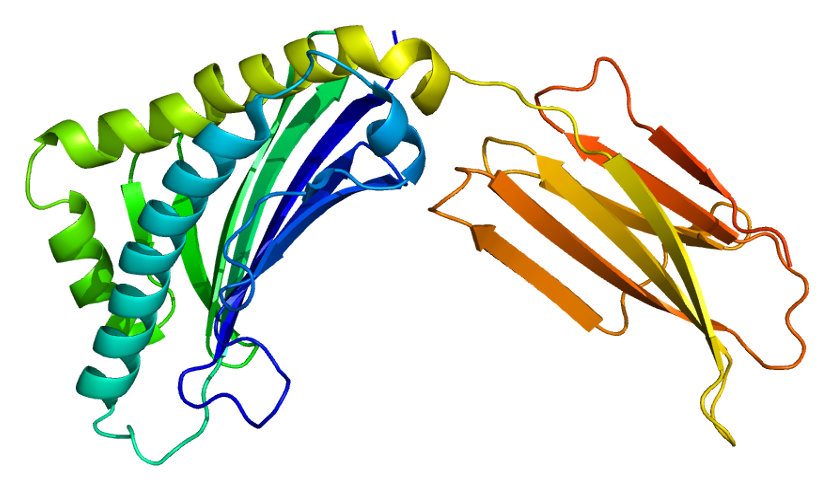

Identifiers
- Aliases: AZGP1, ZA2G, ZAG, alpha-2-glycoprotein 1, zinc-binding
- External IDs: OMIM: 194460; MGI: 103163; GeneCards: AZGP1
Available structures
PDB	Ortholog search: PDBe RCSB
PDB	List of PDB id codes 1T7V, 1T7W, 1T7X, 1T7Y, 1T7Z, 1T80, 1ZAG, 3ES6

Gene location (Human)
Chr.	Chromosome 7 (human)
Band	7q22.1	Start	99,966,720 bp
Band	7q22.1	End	99,976,042 bp

Gene location (Mouse)
Chr.	Chromosome 5 (mouse)
Band	5 G2|5 76.92 cM	Start	137,979,782 bp
Band	5 G2|5 76.92 cM	End	137,988,495 bp
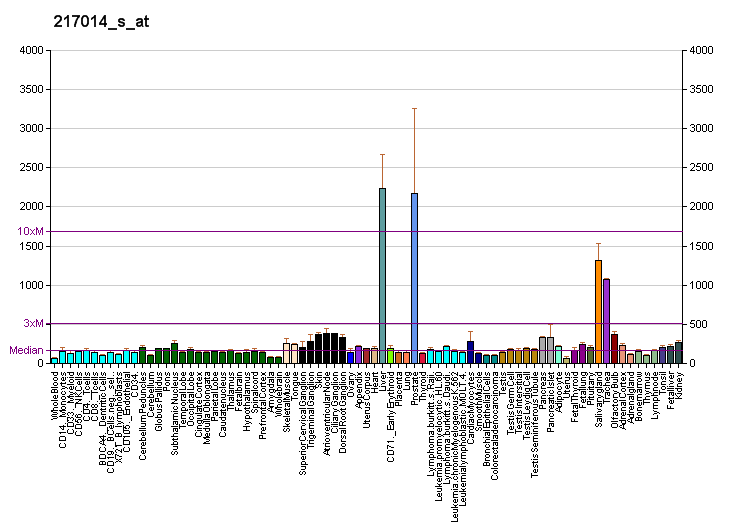

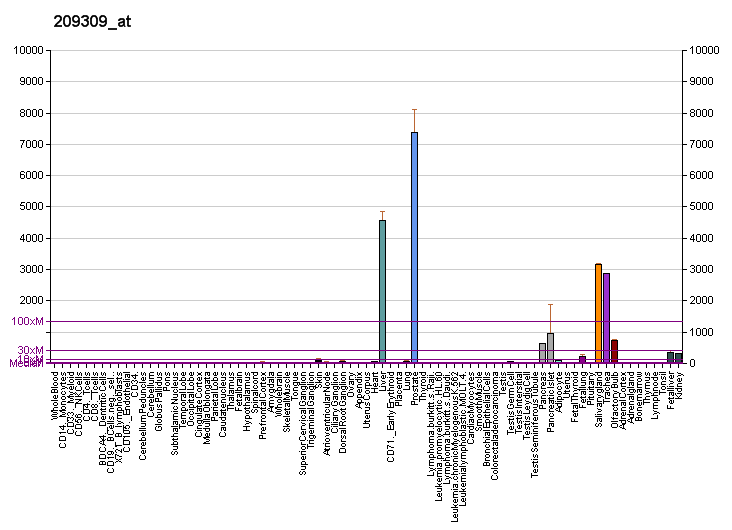
RNA expression pattern
Bgee	Human / Mouse (ortholog); Top expressed in: parotid gland; right lobe of liver; olfactory zone of nasal mucosa; trachea; body of pancreas; lactiferous duct; skin of arm; skin of leg; skin of thigh; skin of abdomen / Top expressed in: left lobe of liver; gallbladder; lacrimal gland; superior surface of tongue; right kidney; parotid gland; proximal tubule; olfactory epithelium; epithelium of stomach; human kidney; More reference expression data
BioGPS	More reference expression data
Gene ontology
Molecular function	protein transmembrane transporter activity; ribonuclease activity; protein binding
Cellular component	plasma membrane; extracellular exosome; nucleus; extracellular space; extracellular matrix; extracellular region; collagen-containing extracellular matrix; external side of plasma membrane
Biological process	detection of chemical stimulus involved in sensory perception of bitter taste; retina homeostasis; cell adhesion; transmembrane transport; negative regulation of cell population proliferation; protein transmembrane transport; RNA phosphodiester bond hydrolysis; immune response
Sources:Amigo / QuickGO
Orthologs
Databases	NCBI: entry; OMA: entry
Species	Human	Mouse
Entrez	563	12007
Ensembl	ENSG00000160862	ENSMUSG00000037053
UniProt	P25311	Q64726
RefSeq (mRNA)	NM_001185	NM_013478
RefSeq (protein)	NP_001176	NP_038506
Location (UCSC)	Chr 7: 99.97 – 99.98 Mb	Chr 5: 137.98 – 137.99 Mb
PubMed search
- Wikidata
View/Edit Human	View/Edit Mouse

Zinc-alpha-2-glycoprotein is a protein that in humans is encoded by the AZGP1 gene. AZGP1, also referred to as zinc-alpha-2-glycoprotein (ZAG), is a glycoprotein with a molecular weight of 38-40 kDa. In 1961, AZGP1 was initially isolated from normal human plasma and named as ZAG due to its distinctive electrophoretic mobility within the alpha-2 region and its ability to bind to zinc. Subsequent analysis further identified its specific location on a particular chromosome on chromosome 7q22.1 by fluorescence in situ hybridization. AZGP1 is widely expressed in various tissues and body fluids, including the breast, stomach, liver, prostate, plasma, urine, and saliva.

This gene expresses a soluble protein that stimulates lipolysis, induces a reduction in body fat in mice, is associated with the cachexia related to cancer, and is known to be expressed in secretory cells of lung epithelium. In 2009, it was found that smoking increases expression of this gene, which is why smoking cessation leads to weight gain. Decreased circulating AZGP1 levels are associated with diabetes 2.

AZGP1 has been identified as a biomarker in cancer patients, with its role varying depending on the specific type of cancer. Low expression of AZGP1 is correlated with unfavorable outcomes in gastric cancer, esophageal squamous cell carcinoma, liver cancer, bladder cancer, and prostate cancer. For example, AZGP1 is a potential biomarker for predicting surgical failure and negatively regulates angiogenesis in prostate cancer. Elevated levels of AZGP1 have been significantly associated with poor overall survival and disease-free survival in colon cancer.

== See also ==
- ZAG peptide
