= Stearamidopropyl dimethylamine =

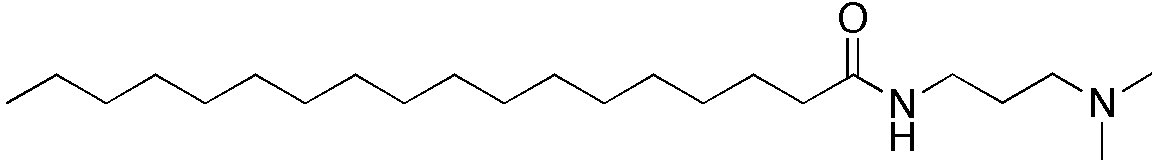
- Skeletal formula of stearamidopropyl dimethylamine

Names
- Preferred IUPAC name N-[3-(Dimethylamino)propyl]octadecanamide
- Other names N-(3-Dimethylaminopropyl)octadecanamide

Identifiers
CAS Number	7651-02-7
3D model (JSmol)	Interactive image
ChemSpider	55945
ECHA InfoCard	100.028.736
EC Number	231-609-1
MeSH	N-(3-(dimethylamino)propyl)octadecanamide
PubChem CID	62109
UNII	K7VEI00UFR
CompTox Dashboard (EPA)	DTXSID9064762
- InChI: InChI=1S/C23H48N2O/c1-4-5-6-7-8-9-10-11-12-13-14-15-16-17-18-20-23(26)24-21-19-22-25(2)3/h4-22H2,1-3H3,(H,24,26) Key: WWVIUVHFPSALDO-UHFFFAOYSA-N
- SMILES: CCCCCCCCCCCCCCCCCC(=O)NCCCN(C)C

Properties
Chemical formula	C_{23}H_{48}N_{2}O
Molar mass	368.650 g·mol^{−1}
- Except where otherwise noted, data are given for materials in their standard state (at 25 °C [77 °F], 100 kPa). verify (what is ?) Infobox references

Stearamidopropyl dimethylamine is an ingredient in some types of hair conditioner. It has antistatic, emulsifying, hair conditioning, and surfactant properties. It is water soluble, readily biodegradable, and mildly toxic to aquatic life.
