= Small copper carrier =

Small copper carrier or SCC is a small molecule that transports copper in urine. It is excreted in the kidneys in humans or mice where the liver is unable to excrete excess copper in bile. This happens in Wilson's disease where the presence of copper in urine is a diagnostic. It was discovered by Lawrence Wilson Gray and Svetlana Lutsenko. The molecule is 2 kDa. Its exact nature is not yet known but is presumed to be a peptide.

The same peptide also appears in blood and urine of many different mammals. Its copper free molecular weight is 1329.5. In neutral conditions the small copper carrier molecule has a negative charge. Copper is bound to the carrier via oxygen and nitrogen (O or N).
