= Palmitoyl tripeptide-38 =

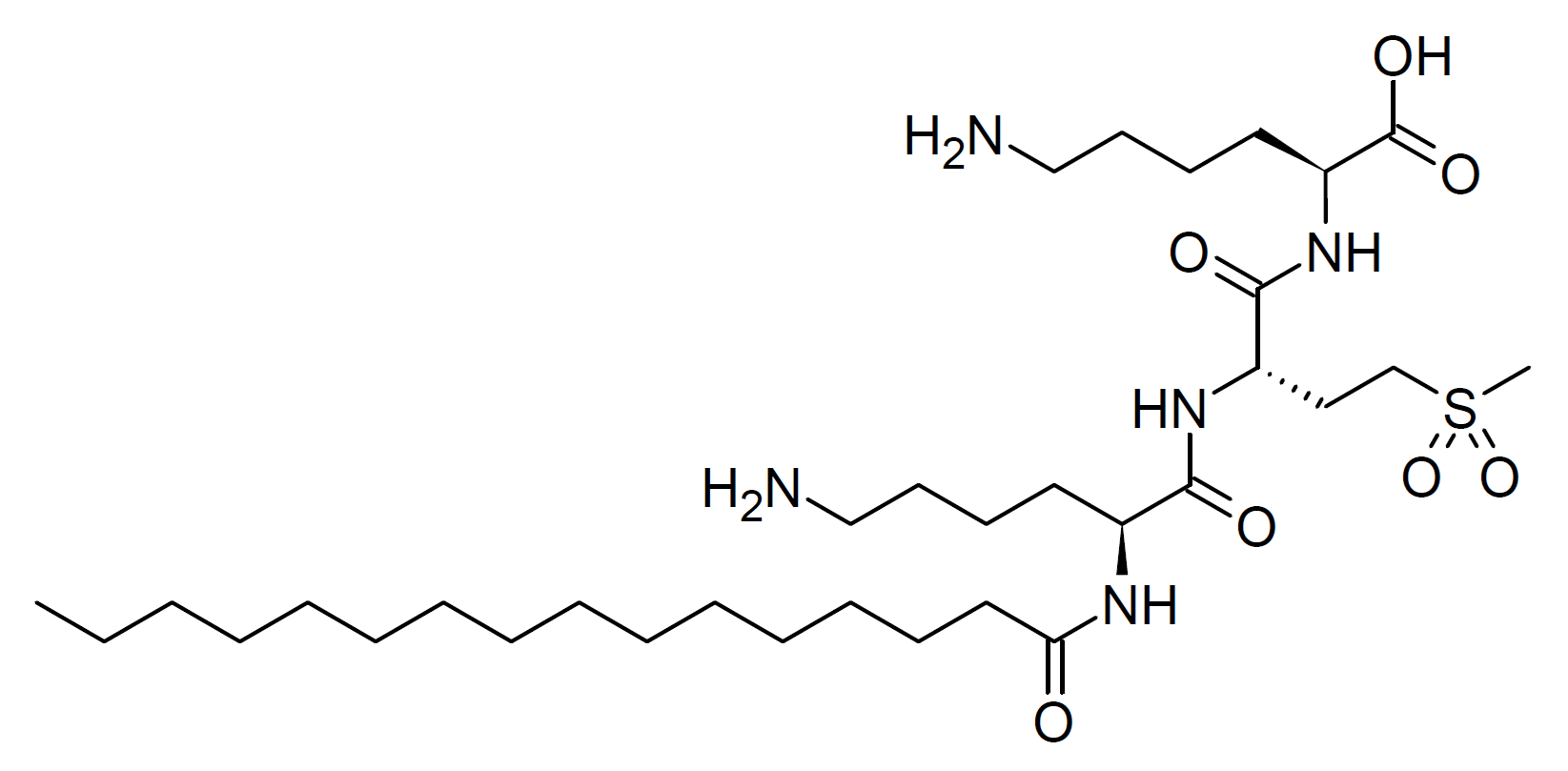

Identifiers
- IUPAC name: (2S)-6-amino-2-[[(2S)-2-[[(2S)-6-amino-2-(hexadecanoylamino)hexanoyl]amino]-4-methylsulfonylbutanoyl]amino]hexanoic acid
- CAS Number: 1101448-24-1 1447824-23-8
- PubChem CID: 71587932
- ChemSpider: 32701084
- UNII: T7A529FB8O

Chemical and physical data
- Formula: C_{33}H_{65}N_{5}O_{7}S
- Molar mass: 675.97 g·mol^{−1}
- 3D model (JSmol): Interactive image
- SMILES: CCCCCCCCCCCCCCCC(=O)N[C@@H](CCCCN)C(=O)N[C@@H](CCS(=O)(=O)C)C(=O)N[C@@H](CCCCN)C(=O)O
- InChI: InChI=1S/C33H65N5O7S/c1-3-4-5-6-7-8-9-10-11-12-13-14-15-22-30(39)36-27(20-16-18-24-34)31(40)37-28(23-26-46(2,44)45)32(41)38-29(33(42)43)21-17-19-25-35/h27-29H,3-26,34-35H2,1-2H3,(H,36,39)(H,37,40)(H,38,41)(H,42,43)/t27-,28-,29-/m0/s1; Key:RGXYBFJDNNODFP-AWCRTANDSA-N

Palmitoyl Tripeptide-38 (Pal-Lys-Met(O2)-Lys, Matrixyl Synthe’6) is a tripeptide that is derived from a sequence found in the connective tissue proteins collagen VI and laminin, conjugated with a lipophilic palmitoyl chain for improved absorption into the skin. It is claimed to stimulate endogenous biosynthesis of collagens, fibronectin, hyaluronic acid and laminin, and is used in skincare products for its purported anti-aging effects.

== See also ==
- Ac-SDKP
- KPV tripeptide
- GHK-Cu
- Glycyl-prolyl-hydroxyproline
- Palmitoyl pentapeptide-4
- Palmitoyl tetrapeptide-7
- Silk peptides
- Tetrapeptide-21
