= Reduced cream =

New Zealand canned dairy product

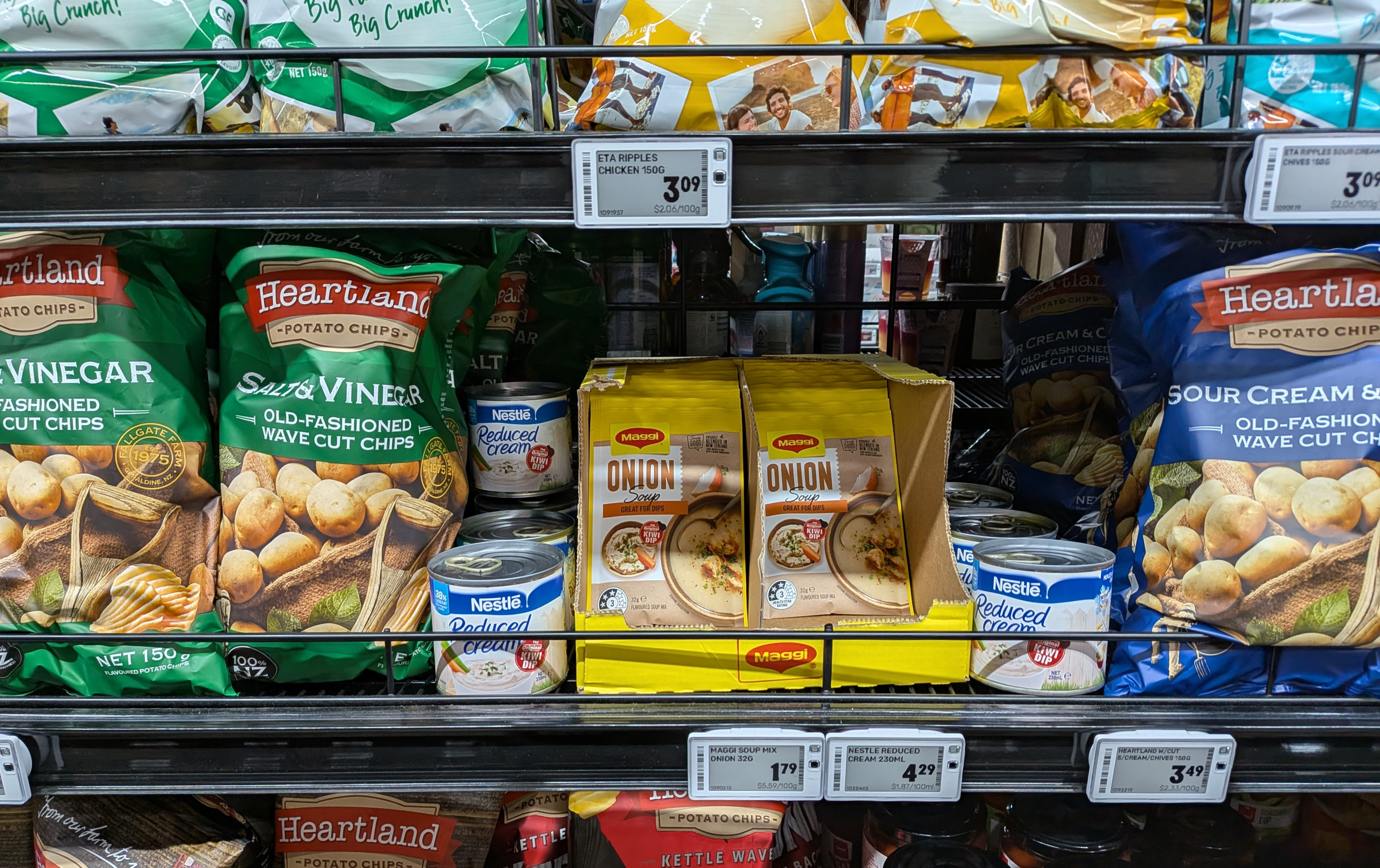
Ingredients for kiwi onion dip displayed together on a shelf in a Four Square (Paihia, New Zealand), next to potato chips.

Reduced cream is a New Zealand canned dairy product.

It was originally sold by Nestlé, but other companies in New Zealand have created their own reduced cream products. Typical ingredients are skimmed milk, cream, and thickener 401 (sodium alginate).

It is offered as a low-fat alternative to cream, with Nestlé claiming theirs has "38% less fat than thickened cream". Reduced cream does not require refrigeration.

== Use ==
Reduced cream is used to make Kiwi onion dip, along with Maggi-brand instant onion soup (another Nestlé brand). The recipe was developed by Rosemary Dempsey in the late 1950s or early 1960s at Nestlé's newly established test kitchen in Auckland.
