= Kiwi onion dip =

Dipping sauce eaten in New Zealand

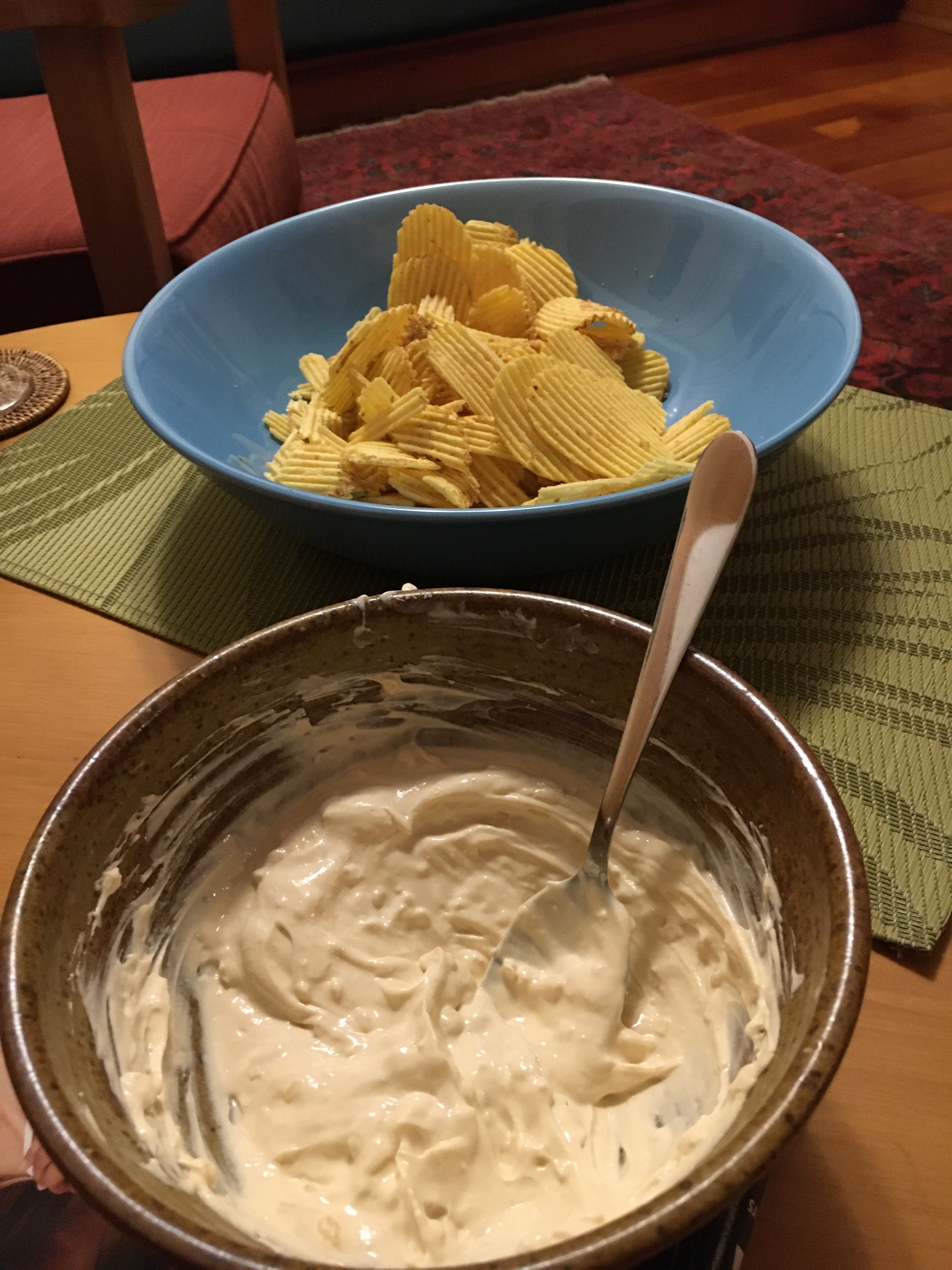
- Type: Dipping sauce
- Place of origin: New Zealand
- Created by: Rosemary Dempsey
- Invented: 1950s or 60s
- Serving temperature: Chilled
- Main ingredients: Powdered onion soup, reduced cream
- Variations: Lemon juice, parsley, vinegar
- Other information: Kiwi onion dip is an iconic dish in New Zealand cuisine, often enjoyed at parties and social occasions.

Kiwi onion dip is a type of dipping sauce eaten in New Zealand. Often referred to as 'kiwi dip', 'onion dip' or 'original kiwi dip', it consists of a packet of powdered onion soup stirred into a can of reduced cream, sometimes with lemon juice or malt vinegar added, which is then left to refrigerate and thicken. "Kiwi" refers to this being a New Zealand dish, as opposed to the dip containing kiwifruit or kiwi (bird) products. Served alongside potato chips, crackers, or chopped vegetables, the dip is a popular dish at parties, barbeques, and other social occasions.

== Creation ==
Kiwi onion dip's creation has been credited to Rosemary Dempsey, a home economist for Nestlé New Zealand in the 1950s or 60s. Dempsey was charged with finding new uses for products slipping down the sales charts, in this case onion soup mix, and tried a variety of other Nestlé products before hitting on the successful combination with reduced cream. Dempsey went on to become the New Zealand Herald's first food editor.

== In popular culture ==
The dip has assumed an iconic status in New Zealand cuisine. In February 2019 Nestlé released a campaign bannered "Kiwi as", aligning the dip with canonical moments in New Zealand popular culture. Lauraine Jacobs, a food writer, has said Kiwi onion dip is an “all-time classic”. “My mother made it. My son and his wife make it, and think themselves clever. So now it is the darling of yet another generation." The dip is often missed by New Zealanders living abroad who may not have access to reduced cream, a dairy product only widely available in their home country. In 2019 it was reported cans of reduced cream are commonly found in the suitcases of New Zealanders as they travel overseas.

In April 2019, Countdown supermarket announced the introduction of 'NZ Onion Dip Icecream', a two-litre tub of ice cream flavoured with caramelised onions and reduced cream. The product was later declared by the supermarket to be an April Fools' joke.

In 2022, the Kiwi onion dip with Eta's Salt and Vinegar Ripple Chips is the combined replication challenge for episode six of season one of Snackmasters NZ.

== See also ==
- French onion dip
- List of dips

== External sources ==
- Rosemary Dempsey interviewed on The Breeze in May 2024
