= Skin cream =

Skin cream may refer to:

- Cream (pharmacy), a preparation usually for application to the skin
- Moisturizer, a cosmetic preparation used for protecting, moisturizing, and lubricating the skin
