= Polydeoxyribonucleotide =

Chemical compound

Polydeoxyribonucleotide (PDRN), is a mixture of single-stranded oligonucleotides with weight ranging from approximately 50 kDa to 1500 kDa, peaking around 350kDa in some commercial forms. PDRN was originally isolated from human placenta for potential pharmaceutical applications in Italy, but it is now obtained by fractionating and purifying DNA extracted from salmon or trout sperm. Novel sources of PDRN are being further studied but salmon or trout sperm cells are more commonly used as they are easily processed and readily available DNA source. PDRN has anti-inflammatory effects, stimulates collagen production and promotes angiogenesis, and is mainly used in pharmaceutical applications with purported anti-wrinkle and anti-aging effects. Additionally, it has shown improvement and acceleration of wound healing and tissue repair, demonstrated in treatment of tendinopathy and diabetic foot ulcers. The mechanism involves activation of adenosine A2A receptors, upregulating expression of vascular endothelial growth factor (VEGF), and stimulation of the DNA salvage pathway.

== Mechanism of action ==
The primary mechanism of action by PDRN is the adenosine A2A receptor pathway, which is activated following enzymatic degradation of the deoxyribonucleotide polymers. Adenosine acts the primary ligand which binds to the G protein-coupled receptor A2A leading to an increase in intracellular cyclic AMP (cAMP) levels. This secondary messenger activates protein kinase A (PKA) acting as a signaling cascade of several pathways downstream.Thus, enhacing tissue repair through upregulation of PI3K/Akt and vascular endothelial growth factor (VEGF). The activation of the A2A pathway is observed to be conserved across various PDRN sources, yet it activates different downstream pathways depending on the type of tissue and injury.

Additionally, PDRN contributes to the salvage pathway, which is a metabolic mechanism that supports nucleotide synthesis for processes like DNA replication and celullar proliferation. For injuries needing faster regeneration, this nucleoside input is essential, highlighling the importance of both signaling and metabolic pathways for optimal tissue repair.

== Molecular characteristics ==
PDRN is a polyanionic, hydrophilic molecule whose molecular weight varies due to differences in biological extraction and purification processes. Even though this molecule ranges from 50 to 1500 kDa (primarily between 80 - 200 kDa), lower-molecular-weight fragments have shown better biological activity compared to higher-molecular-weight counterparts. Salmon-derived PDRN fragment characteristics have become the standard because of its ready availability and ease of processing, yields highly purified product (~95%) helping avoid potential immunological side effects.

== Medical and clinical applications ==
=== Wound healing and tissue repair ===
Even though PDRN's positive effects on wound healing and tissue repair were initially observed only in ephithelial tissue, it has also shown these effects across multiple tissue models. For instance, studies focused in wound closure in diabetic foot ulcers showed that PDRN can significantly reduce the time compared to placebo. The use of PDRN for wound treatment in clinical trials is considered cost-effective since it reduces hospital stays and the need for additional treatments. Moreover, PDRN showed significant improvement of mucosal healing, reduction of tissue injury and promotion of restoration of intestinal structure and function in a murine colitis model. However, one of the most common applications of this molecule in Asia is as a dematological biostumulator, because of its positive effects on the skin after abrasive procedures like laser or microneedling.

=== Anti-inflammatory uses ===
One of its therapeutic effects is its ability to reduce inflammatory responses by decreasing synthesis of pro-inflammatory cytokines and inhibiting inflammatory signaling pathways, such as NF-kB. Excessive inflammation not only further damages tissue but also slows the healing process, making PDRN's anti-inflammatory activity as a key feature of its effects. PDRN showed modulation of markers connected to chronic low-grade inflammation (also referred to as inflammaging) and age-related deterioration, suggesting these properties may enhance tissue homeostasis under conditions of prologed stress.

== Alternative PDRN sources ==
Variability in biological sources and production methods have shown to contribute to variations in biological activity of PDRN, more specifically with celullar pathways activation. As a results, alternative sources of PDRN are an ongoing research field that aims to better identify alternative sources with their associated effects.

In addition to the standard animal-derived PDRN, there are other alternatives like plant, microbial and human-derived PDRN that have been studied to improve sustainbility and efficiency depending on the tissue model. These alternative sources gained more interest since low-molecular weight PDRN is related to better bioavailability, celullar uptake and skin penetration. Most alternative-source preparations contain DNA fragments with lower molecular weight than the animal-derived PDRN.

== See also ==
- Defibrotide - a similar mixture of DNA fragments purified from pig intestinal mucosa and used as an anticoagulant.
- Silk peptides - a mixture of hydrolysed silk proteins used for similar cosmetic applications.
