= Acetyl hexapeptide-8 =

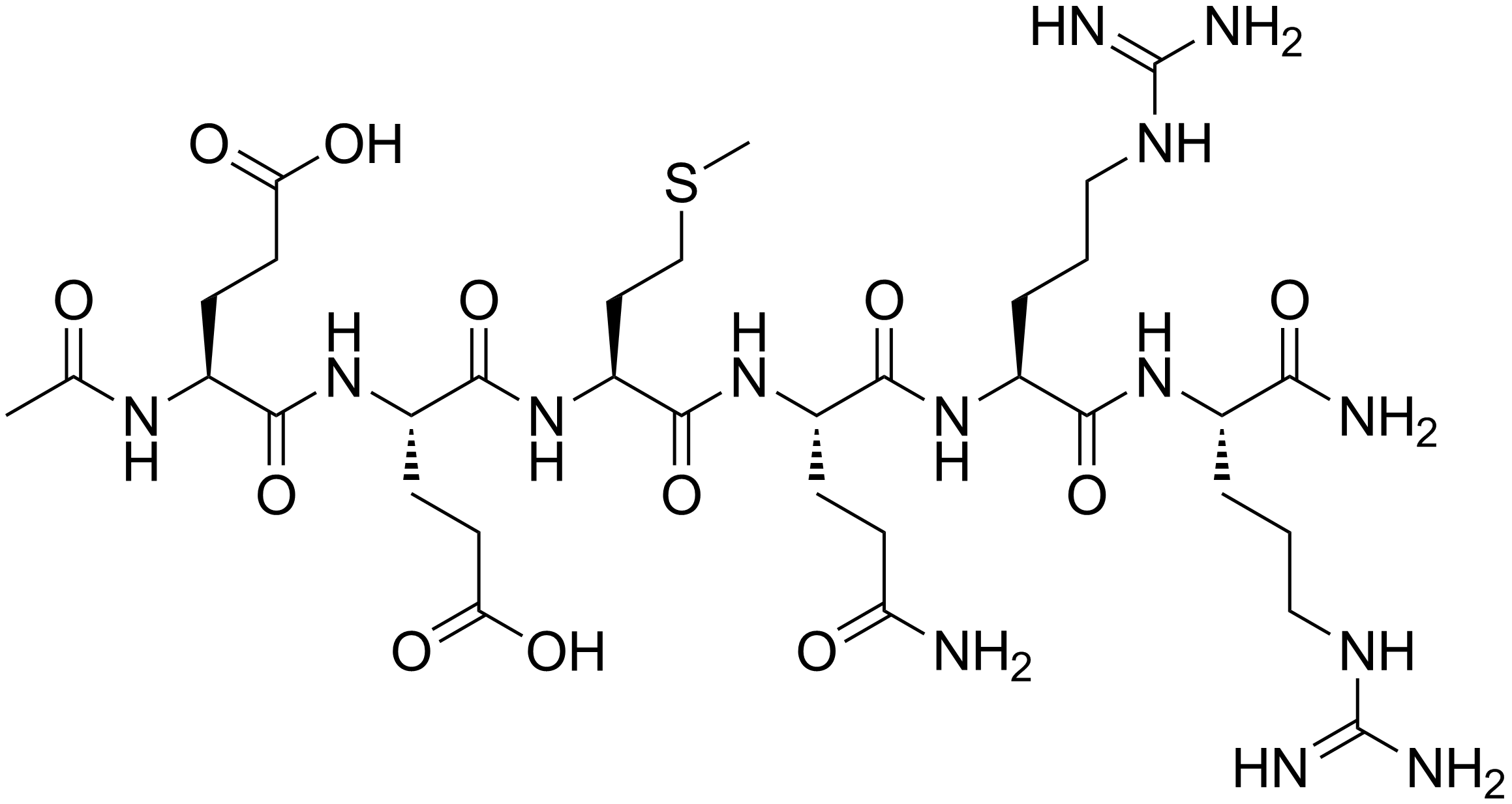
- Stereo, skeletal formula of acetyl hexapeptide-8

Names
- IUPAC name N-acetyl-L-alpha-glutamyl-L-alpha-glutamyl-L-methionyl-L-glutaminyl-L-arginyl-L-argininamide
- Other names: Argireline; Argireline acetate; Acetyl hexapeptide-3 acetate; EEMQRR; Ac-EEMQRR-NH2

Identifiers
CAS Number	616204-22-9
3D model (JSmol)	Interactive image
ChemSpider	9403386
PubChem CID	11228338
UNII	L4EL31FWIL
- InChI: InChI=1S/C34H60N14O12S/c1-17(49)43-20(8-11-25(51)52)29(57)47-22(9-12-26(53)54)31(59)48-23(13-16-61-2)32(60)46-21(7-10-24(35)50)30(58)45-19(6-4-15-42-34(39)40)28(56)44-18(27(36)55)5-3-14-41-33(37)38/h18-23H,3-16H2,1-2H3,(H2,35,50)(H2,36,55)(H,43,49)(H,44,56)(H,45,58)(H,46,60)(H,47,57)(H,48,59)(H,51,52)(H,53,54)(H4,37,38,41)(H4,39,40,42)/t18-,19-,20-,21-,22-,23-/m0/s1 Key: RJZNPROJTJSYLC-LLINQDLYSA-N
- SMILES: CSCC[C@H](NC(=O)[C@H](CCC(O)=O)NC(=O)[C@H](CCC(O)=O)NC(C)=O)C(=O)N[C@@H](CCC(N)=O)C(=O)N[C@@H](CCCNC(N)=N)C(=O)N[C@@H](CCCNC(N)=N)C(N)=O

Properties
Chemical formula	C_{34}H_{60}N_{14}O_{12}S
Molar mass	889.00 g·mol^{−1}

Related compounds
Related compounds	Gusperimus; Stearamidopropyl dimethylamine

Pharmacology
ATC code	N-Acetyl-L-alpha-glutamyl-L-alpha-glutamyl-L-methionyl-L-glutaminyl-L-arginyl-L-argininamide
Routes of administration	topical
Legal status	US: OTC
- Except where otherwise noted, data are given for materials in their standard state (at 25 °C [77 °F], 100 kPa). verify (what is ?) Infobox references

Acetyl hexapeptide-8, also known as acetyl hexapeptide-8 amide and Argireline (also incorrectly referred to as acetyl hexapeptide-3), is a synthetic hexapeptide used as a topical cosmetic ingredient that may improve the appearance of wrinkles. It is a small peptide fragment of SNAP25, a protein involved in neurotransmitter release and one of the targets of botulinum toxin type A, commonly known as Botox.

Acetyl hexapeptide-8 is proposed to have a mechanism of action similar to that of its biomimetic, botulinum toxin, by inhibiting the SNARE complex responsible for synaptic vesicle fusion, thereby reducing facial muscle contractions. This proposed mechanism has led to its use in anti-aging products as a potential non-invasive alternative to injectable neurotoxins. No clinical studies have directly compared the efficacy of acetyl hexapeptide-8 to botulinum toxin, and the concentration required to achieve similar effects remains uncertain.

Acetyl hexapeptide-8 has been available since 2001, and is commercially marketed under the trade name Argireline by Lubrizol.

== Overview and common uses ==
Acetyl hexapeptide-8 is used in attempts to decrease the visible effects of aging by reducing the deep wrinkles and lines that occur around the forehead and eyes.

Chemically, when applied as a solution to specific areas of the face, acetyl hexapeptide-8 inhibits the reactions that cause muscles to move or contract – for example when forming facial expressions such as smiling or frowning.

== Research ==
Acetyl hexapeptide-8 has shown potential in improving the appearance of wrinkles, though the clinical significance of these effects remains uncertain due to inconsistent measurement methods and a lack of standardized clinical trials. Both in vitro (laboratory) and in vivo (in living organisms) studies have been conducted, but no dedicated double-blind clinical trials evaluating its anti-wrinkle efficacy are currently available.

A 2012 double-blind placebo-controlled study on blepharospasm found that patients who received botulinum toxin injections followed by acetyl hexapeptide-8 cream experienced an extended duration of symptom relief compared to those who used a placebo cream, although the study did not focus on cosmetic outcomes.

A 2025 review reported that while some studies have observed improvements in wrinkle appearance with acetyl hexapeptide-8, the statistical significance of these findings has been inconsistent. More consistent results have been seen when acetyl hexapeptide-8 is used as part of multi-ingredient topical formulations, although these vary widely in composition.

It has limited cutaneous absorption, likely due to its large molecular weight (889 Da) and hydrophilicity, which would negatively affect topical delivery systems. A 2015 study showed that after 24 hours, less than 0.2% of the applied peptide penetrated the stratum corneum, the outermost layer of the skin, with the majority removed after washing (99.7%).

== Safety ==
The 2012 study concluded there were no significant adverse effects. Patients receiving botulinum toxin injections exhibited longer times until return to baseline symptoms when supported with daily application of acetyl hexapeptide-8.

Compared to botulinum toxin, acetyl hexapeptide-8 shows lower potency and toxicity, and no serious adverse effects reported.

== Chemistry ==
Acetyl hexapeptide-8 is the hexapeptide with the amino acid sequence: Ac-Glu-Glu-Met-Gln-Arg-Arg-NH_{2}.

== See also ==
- Syn-AKE
