= Silk peptides =

Natural water-soluble glycoprotein

Silk peptides, also known as silk amino acids (SAAs), are a water-soluble mixture of short to medium chain peptides and glycoproteins derived from hydrolysis of raw silk. They are used as an additive in skin and hair care products due to their high levels of serine which has excellent moisture preservation characteristics. They are used to provide a protective barrier and silky feel to lotions, soaps, personal lubricants, hair and skincare products. Silk peptides are produced by hydrolyzing (or breaking apart) silk proteins into smaller peptide chains. Silk peptides have a lower molecular weight than silk protein powders and are claimed to be moisturizing to skin and hair.

== Composition ==
Silk is made up of two primary proteins; a fibrous protein known as fibroin, and a sticky protein known as sericin, with the two comprising 70–80% and 20–30% of silk, respectively. The source of these silk amino acids is typically the cocoons of the domestic silk moth, Bombyx mori, although other sources are known. Silk peptides are produced by acid hydrolysis of silk followed by neutralization of excess acid, filtration, and further processing steps to remove salts and other impurities followed by freeze drying. The resultant product contains a mixture of peptides typically between 2 and 20 amino acids in length, with a major component being the 18 amino acid fragment GAGAGSGAGAGSGAGAGS comprising three repeat units of the β‑sheet motif Gly-Ala-Gly-Ala-Gly-Ser derived from the repetitive crystalline domain of silk fibroin protein.

== Amino acid proportions ==
Predominant composition of silk amino acids (by weight*):

- L-Alanine (34.36%)
- Glycine (27.23%)
- L-Serine (9.58%)
- L-Valine (3.49%)
- L-Threonine (2.00%)
- [*SAA contains other amino acids but only those representing >2.00% are listed due to their greater relevance]

== Applications ==
Due to its proteinous nature, silk peptide is susceptible to the action of proteolytic enzymes, making it digestible and biocompatible; and because of properties like its gelling ability, moisture retention capacity and skin adhesion, it has numerous medical, pharmaceutical and cosmetic applications.

== See also ==
- Acetyl hexapeptide-3
- GHK-Cu
- Glycyl-prolyl-hydroxyproline
- Hyaluronic acid
- KPV tripeptide
- Matrikine
- Palmitoyl pentapeptide-4
- Polydeoxyribonucleotide
