= Copper peptide GHK-Cu =

GHK-Cu
- Tripeptide

Names
- IUPAC name 6-Amino-2-[[2-[(2-aminoacetyl)amino]-3-(1H-imidazol-5-yl)propanoyl]amino]hexanoic acid
- Other names Glycyl-L-Histidyl-L-Lysine; Growth-modulating peptide; Kollaren; Liver cell growth factor; Liver growth factor Cu-GHK; Glycyl-histidyl-lysine, monocopper salt, Prezatide copper

Identifiers
CAS Number	49557-75-7; (Cu complex): 89030-95-5
3D model (JSmol)	Interactive image; (Cu complex): Interactive image
ChEBI	CHEBI:95185
ChemSpider	66263; (Cu complex): 335491
PubChem CID	342538; (Cu complex): 378611
UNII	39TG2H631E; (Cu complex): 6BJQ43T1I9
CompTox Dashboard (EPA)	DTXSID20237492 DTXSID30197831, DTXSID20237492
- InChI: InChI=1S/C14H24N6O4/c15-4-2-1-3-10(14(23)24)20-13(22)11(19-12(21)6-16)5-9-7-17-8-18-9/h7-8,10-11H,1-6,15-16H2,(H,17,18)(H,19,21)(H,20,22)(H,23,24) Key: MVORZMQFXBLMHM-UHFFFAOYSA-N; (Cu complex): InChI=1S/C14H24N6O4.Cu/c15-4-2-1-3-10(14(23)24)20-13(22)11(19-12(21)6-16)5-9-7-17-8-18-9;/h7-8,10-11H,1-6,15-16H2,(H,17,18)(H,19,21)(H,20,22)(H,23,24); Key: DIWZQABMLHSNJR-UHFFFAOYSA-N
- SMILES: O=C(N[C@@H](CC1=CN=CN1)C(N[C@@H](CCCCN)C(O)=O)=O)CN; (Cu complex): C1=C(NC=N1)CC(C(=O)NC(CCCCN)C(=O)O)NC(=O)CN.[Cu]

Properties
Chemical formula	C_{14}H_{24}N_{6}O_{4} C_{14}H_{22}CuN_{6}O_{4} (Cu complex)
Molar mass	340.38 g/mol
Solubility in water	130.98 g/L
- Except where otherwise noted, data are given for materials in their standard state (at 25 °C [77 °F], 100 kPa). verify (what is ?) Infobox references

Copper peptide GHK-Cu is a naturally occurring copper complex of the tripeptide glycyl-L-histidyl-L-lysine. The tripeptide has strong affinity for copper(II) and was first isolated from human plasma. It can be found also in saliva and urine.

== Overview ==
Several copper(II)-peptide complexes occur naturally. In human plasma, the level of GHK-Cu is about 200 ng/ml at age 20. By the age of 60, the level drops to 80 ng/ml. In humans, GHK-Cu is proposed to promote wound healing, attraction of immune cells, antioxidant and anti-inflammatory effects, stimulation of collagen and glycosaminoglycan synthesis in skin fibroblasts and promotion of blood vessels growth. Recent studies revealed its ability to modulate expression of a large number of human genes. Synthetic GHK-Cu is used in cosmetics as a reparative and anti-aging ingredient.

== History ==
Loren Pickart (1938–2023) isolated the copper peptide GHK-Cu from human plasma albumin in 1973. It was noticed that liver tissue obtained from patients aged 60 to 80 years had an increased level of fibrinogen. However, when liver cells from old patients were incubated in the blood from the younger group, the older cells started functioning in nearly the same way as the younger liver tissue. It turned out that this effect was due to a small peptide factor that behaved similarly to the synthetic peptide glycyl-L-histidyl-L-lysine (GHK). Pickart proposed that this activity in human plasma albumin was a tripeptide glycyl-L-histidyl-L-lysine and that it might function by chelating metal ions.

In 1977, the growth modulating peptide was shown to be a glycyl-L-histidyl-L-lysine. It is proposed that GHK-Cu modulates copper intake into cells.

== Wound healing ==
=== Biochemical studies ===
In the late 1980s, copper peptide GHK-Cu started attracting attention as a promising wound healing agent. At picomolar to nanomolar concentrations, GHK-Cu stimulated the synthesis of collagen in skin fibroblasts, increased accumulation of total proteins, glycosaminoglycans (in a biphasic curve) and DNA in the dermal wounds in rats. They also found out that the GHK sequence is present in collagen and suggested that the GHK peptide is released after tissue injury. They proposed a class of emergency response molecules which are released from the extracellular matrix at the site of an injury. GHK-Cu also increased synthesis of decorin – a small proteoglycan involved in the regulation of collagen synthesis, wound healing regulation and anti-tumor defense. GHK-Cu has been shown to produce anti-inflammatory effects and stimulate release of growth factors such as brain-derived neurotrophic factor (BDNF), vascular endothelial growth factor (VEGF) and bone morphogenetic protein 2 (BMP-2).

It was also established that GHK-Cu stimulates both the synthesis of metalloproteinases, the enzymes which break down dermal proteins, and their inhibitors (anti-proteases). The fact that GHK-Cu not only stimulates the production of dermal components, but also regulates their breakdown suggests that it should be used with caution.

=== Wound healing in animals ===
A series of animal experiments established pronounced wound healing activity of GHK-Cu. In the dermal wounds of rabbits GHK-Cu facilitated wound healing, causing better wound contraction, faster development of granular tissue and improved angiogenesis. It also elevated the level of antioxidant enzymes.

GHK-Cu has been found to induce a systemic enhancement of healing in rats, mice, and pigs; that is, the GHK-Cu peptide injected in one area of the body (such as the thigh muscles) improved healing at distant body areas (such as the ears). These treatments strongly increased healing parameters such as collagen production, angiogenesis, and wound closure in both wound chambers and full thickness wounds. In one study, full‐thickness wounds of 6 millimeters in diameter were created in an ischemic skin flap on the backs of rats, and for 13 days the wound sites were then treated daily with topical GHK-Cu or topical hydroxypropyl methylcellulose vehicle, or given no treatment. At the end of the study, the wound size had decreased by 64.5% in the GHK group; by 45.6% in the vehicle-treated group; and by 28.2% in the control group. The difference between the GHK group's wounds and those of the control group was significant, and was accompanied by significantly lower levels of tumor necrosis factor alpha and elastin-degrading matrix metalloproteinases.

Biotinylated GHK-Cu was incorporated into a collagen membrane, which was used as a wound dressing. This GHK-Cu enriched material stimulated wound contraction and cell proliferation, as well as increased expression of antioxidant enzymes. The same material was tested for wound healing in diabetic rats. GHK-Cu treatment resulted in faster wound contraction and epithelization, higher level of glutathione and ascorbic acid, increased synthesis of collagen, and activation of fibroblasts and mast cells. Ischemic open wounds in rats treated with GHK-copper healed faster and had decreased concentration of metalloproteinases 2 and 9 as well as of tumor necrosis factor-beta (a major inflammatory cytokine) compared with vehicle alone or with untreated wounds.

== Cosmetic use ==
Copper peptide GHK-Cu is widely used in anti-aging and hair loss prevention cosmetics (INCI name: Copper tripeptide-1). Several controlled facial studies have shown anti-aging, firming and anti-wrinkle activity of copper peptide GHK-Cu, but with relatively small sample sizes and short duration of use, and further research is required to draw definitive conclusions.

== Biological chemistry ==
=== Copper binding ===
Replacement of histidine with other amino acids showed that the glycine residue plays major role in copper binding, whereas lysine can interact with copper only at alkaline pH. At physiological pH, lysine is able to interact with a cellular receptor. The ability of GHK to interact both with copper and with a cellular receptor may allow it to transfer copper into and from cells. The small size of GHK permits speedy traveling in extracellular space and its easy access to cellular receptors.

The molecular structure of the GHK copper complex (GHK-Cu) has been determined by X-ray crystallography, EPR spectroscopy, X-ray absorption spectroscopy, NMR spectroscopy, as well as other methods such as titration. In the GHK-Cu complex, the Cu (II) ion is coordinated by the nitrogen from the imidazole side chain of the histidine, another nitrogen from the alpha-amino group of glycine and the deprotonated amide nitrogen of the glycine–histidine peptide bond. Since such a structure could not explain a high stability constant of the GHK-Cu complex (log 10 =16.44 vs. 8.68 of the GH copper complex, which is similar to the GHK-Cu structure), it was proposed that another amino group participates in the complex formation. Cu(II) is also coordinated by the oxygen from the carboxyl group of the lysine from the neighboring complex. Another carboxyl group of lysine from a neighboring complex provides the apical oxygen, resulting in the square-planar pyramid configuration. Many researchers proposed that at the physiological pH, GHK-Cu complexes can form binary and ternary structures which may involve amino acid histidine and/or the copper binding region of the albumin molecule. Lau and Sarkar found also that GHK can easily obtain copper 2+ bound to other molecules such as the high affinity copper transport site on plasma albumin (albumin binding constant log 10 =16.2 vs. GHK binding constant 16 log 10 =16.44). It has been established that copper (II) redox activity is silenced when copper ions are complexed with the GHK tripeptide, which allows the delivery of non-toxic copper into the cell.

=== Biological significance ===
Copper is vital for all eukaryotic organisms from microbes to humans. A dozen enzymes (cuproenzymes) use changes in copper oxidation state to catalyze important biochemical reactions including cellular respiration (cytochrome c oxidase), antioxidant defense (ceruloplasmin, superoxide dismutase (SOD), detoxification (metallothioneins), blood clotting (blood clotting factors V and VIII), melanin production (tyrosinase) and the connective tissue formation (lysyl peroxidase). Copper is required for iron metabolism, oxygenation, neurotransmission, embryonic development and many other essential biological processes. Another function of copper is signaling – for example, stem cells require a certain level of copper in the media to start their differentiation into cells needed for repair. Thus, GHK-Cu's ability to bind copper and to modulate its tissue level is a key factor determining its biological activity.

== See also ==
- Acetyl hexapeptide-3
- AHK-Cu
- Angiotensin (1-7)
- BPC-157
- CyRL-QN15
- Glutathione
- Glycyl-prolyl-hydroxyproline
- KPV tripeptide
- Matrikine
- Palmitoyl pentapeptide-4
- Silk peptides
- Small copper carrier unknown but heavier molecule
- TB-500
