= Palmitoyl pentapeptide-4 =

Identifiers
CAS Number	214047-00-4
3D model (JSmol)	Interactive image
ChEMBL	ChEMBL451881
ChemSpider	8072898
ECHA InfoCard	100.126.177
EC Number	606-757-9
PubChem CID	9897237
UNII	KK181SM5JG
- InChI: InChI=1S/C39H75N7O10/c1-4-5-6-7-8-9-10-11-12-13-14-15-16-23-32(50)42-29(21-17-19-24-40)36(52)45-34(28(3)49)38(54)46-33(27(2)48)37(53)43-30(22-18-20-25-41)35(51)44-31(26-47)39(55)56/h27-31,33-34,47-49H,4-26,40-41H2,1-3H3,(H,42,50)(H,43,53)(H,44,51)(H,45,52)(H,46,54)(H,55,56)/t27-,28-,29+,30+,31+,33+,34+/m1/s1 Key: WSGCRSMLXFHGRM-DEVHWETNSA-N
- SMILES: CCCCCCCCCCCCCCCC(=O)N[C@@H](CCCCN)C(=O)N[C@@H]([C@@H](C)O)C(=O)N[C@@H]([C@@H](C)O)C(=O)N[C@@H](CCCCN)C(=O)N[C@@H](CO)C(=O)O

Properties
Chemical formula	C_{39}H_{75}N_{7}O_{10}
Molar mass	802.068 g·mol^{−1}
- Except where otherwise noted, data are given for materials in their standard state (at 25 °C [77 °F], 100 kPa). Infobox references

Palmitoyl pentapeptide-4 (Matrixyl, called palmitoyl pentapeptide-3 before 2006) is a matrikine used in anti-wrinkle cosmetics. It was launched in 2000 as an active ingredient for the personal care industry under the trade name Matrixyl by the French cosmetic active ingredient manufacturer Sederma SAS.

== Chemistry ==
Palmitoyl pentapeptide-4 (Pal-Lys-Thr-Thr-Lys-Ser = Pal-KTTKS) contains 5 amino acids linked to a 16-carbon aliphatic chain for improving the penetration of the molecule through the lipid structures of the skin. It is a matrikine. A number of similar molecules are known.

Matrikines are messenger peptides capable of regulating cell activities by interacting with their specific receptors. They activate certain genes involved in the process of extracellular matrix renewal and cell proliferation. By activating the neosynthesis of extracellular matrix macromolecules, palmitoyl pentapeptide-4 provides an anti-wrinkle effect. Studies (in vitro and in vivo) demonstrating the anti-wrinkle efficacy of this peptide have been conducted and published by Sederma and by independent organisations.

== See also ==
- KPV tripeptide
- GHK-Cu
- Glycyl-prolyl-hydroxyproline
- Palmitoyl Tripeptide-38
