= Glycyl-prolyl-hydroxyproline =

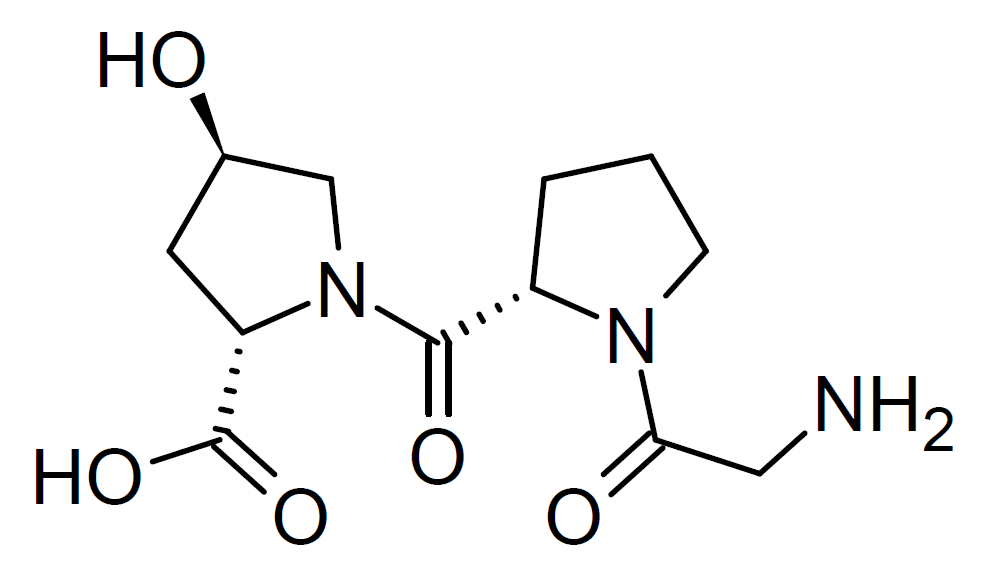

Identifiers
- IUPAC name: (2S,4R)-1-[(2S)-1-(2-aminoacetyl)pyrrolidine-2-carbonyl]-4-hydroxypyrrolidine-2-carboxylic acid
- CAS Number: 2239-67-0
- PubChem CID: 11778669
- ChemSpider: 9953351
- UNII: X6346H6PUM
- ChEBI: CHEBI:193240

Chemical and physical data
- Formula: C_{12}H_{19}N_{3}O_{5}
- Molar mass: 285.300 g·mol^{−1}
- 3D model (JSmol): Interactive image
- SMILES: C1C[C@H](N(C1)C(=O)CN)C(=O)N2C[C@@H](C[C@H]2C(=O)O)O
- InChI: InChI=1S/C12H19N3O5/c13-5-10(17)14-3-1-2-8(14)11(18)15-6-7(16)4-9(15)12(19)20/h7-9,16H,1-6,13H2,(H,19,20)/t7-,8+,9+/m1/s1; Key:SZEOBSAZWJLOGY-VGMNWLOBSA-N

Glycyl-prolyl-hydroxyproline (Gly-Pro-Hyp, Tripeptide-29) is a tripeptide that is derived from collagen. Repeating units of Gly-Pro-Hyp form a major part of collagen protein, and Gly-Pro-Hyp can be readily produced by partial hydrolysis of collagen. Along with other collagen-derived small peptides such as the dipeptides Hyp-Gly and Pro-Hyp, Gly-Pro-Hyp is widely used in skincare products and sometimes taken internally as a dietary supplement, as it is readily absorbed into the skin and stimulates collagen synthesis by fibroblasts, which aids wound healing and may help to reduce signs of aging. Dietary supplements marketed as containing "collagen" often actually contain low molecular weight collagen peptides derived from partial hydrolysis of collagen, as they are better absorbed into the body than collagen itself.

== See also ==
- KPV tripeptide
- GHK-Cu
- Palmitoyl pentapeptide-4
- Palmitoyl Tripeptide-38
- Silk peptides
