= Beta thymosins =

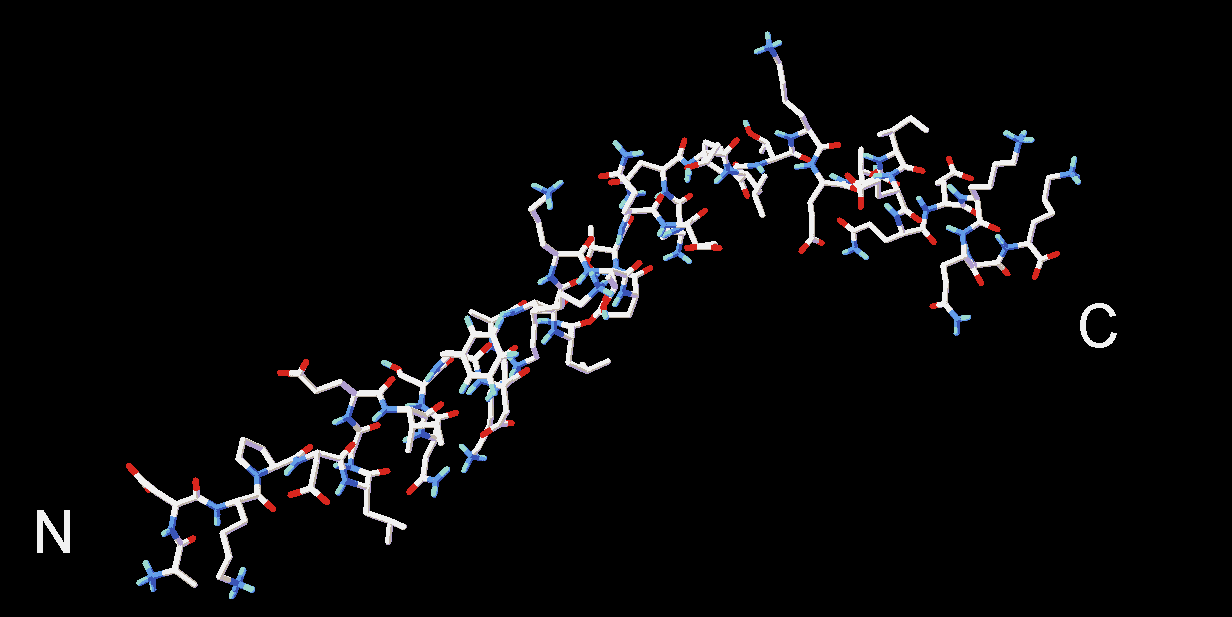
NMR structure of a β-thymosin. Both thymosin α_{1} and β-thymosins are intrinsically unstructured proteins, i.e. they lack a stable fold when free in aqueous solution. This structure, mostly alpha helix, was artificially stabilised by an organic solvent. The thymosin illustrated, originally named β_{9} is the cow orthologue of human β_{10}

Beta thymosins are a family of proteins which have in common a sequence of about 40 amino acids similar to the small protein thymosin β_{4}. They are found almost exclusively in multicellular animals. Thymosin β_{4} was originally obtained from the thymus in company with several other small proteins which although named collectively "thymosins" are now known to be structurally and genetically unrelated and present in many different animal tissues.

== Single domain β-thymosins ==
=== Distribution ===
Thymosin beta-4 family
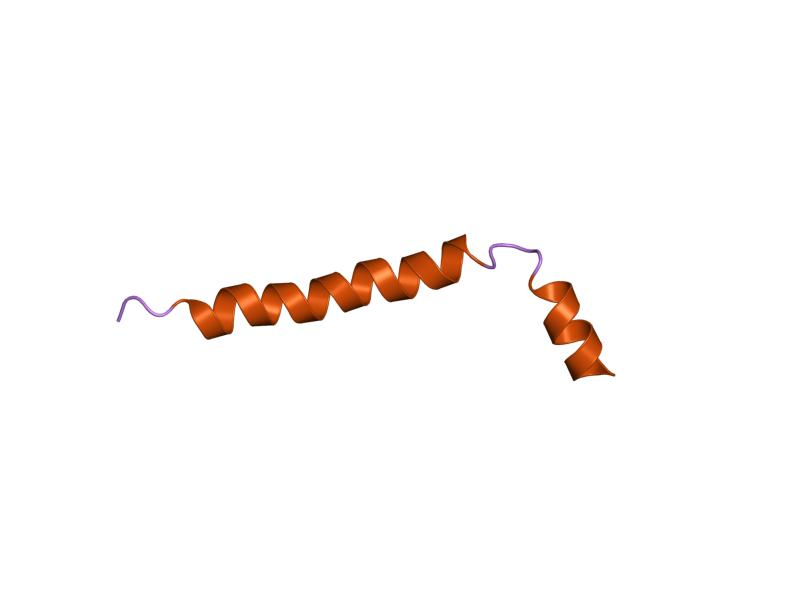
- Structure of thymosin beta 9.

Identifiers
- Symbol: Thymosin
- Pfam: PF01290
- InterPro: IPR001152
- SMART: SM00152
- PROSITE: PDOC00433
- SCOP2: 1hj0 / SCOPe / SUPFAM
Available protein structures:
- Pfam: structures / ECOD
- PDB: RCSB PDB; PDBe; PDBj
- PDBsum: structure summary
- PDB: 1hj0, 1sqk, 1t44, 2ff6

Monomeric β-thymosins, i.e. those of molecular weight similar to the peptides originally isolated from thymus by Goldstein, are found almost exclusively in cells of multicellular animals. Known exceptions are monomeric thymosins found in a few single-celled organisms, significantly those currently regarded as the closest relatives of multicellular animals: choanoflagellates and filastereans. Although found in very early-diverged animals such as sponges, monomeric thymosins are absent from arthropods and nematodes, which do nevertheless possess "β-thymosin repeat proteins" which are constructed from several end-to-end repeats of β-thymosin sequences. Genomics has shown that tetrapods (land vertebrates) each express three monomeric β-thymosins, which are the animal species' equivalents (orthologues) of human β_{4}, β_{10} and β_{15} thymosins, respectively. The human thymosins are encoded by the genes TMSB4X, TMSB10 and TMSB15A and TMSB15B. (In humans, the proteins encoded by the two TMSB15 genes are identical.) Bony fish in general express orthologues of these same three, plus an additional copy of the β_{4} orthologue.

family	gene	locus	protein
β_{4}	TMSB4X	Chr. X q21.3-q22	Thymosin β_{4}
β_{4}	TMSB4Y	Chr. Y	Thymosin β_{4}, Y-chromosomal
β_{10}	TMSB10	Chr. 2 p11.2	Thymosin β_{10}
β_{15}	TMSB15A	Chr. X q21.33-q22.3	Thymosin β_{15}
β_{15}	TMSB15B	Chr. X q22.2	Thymosin β_{15}

Thymosin β_{1} was found to be ubiquitin (truncated by two C-terminal glycine residues).

=== Relation to the WH_{2} sequence module ===
The N-terminal half of β-thymosins bears a strong similarity in amino acid sequence to a very widely distributed sequence module, the WH_{2} module. (Wasp Homology Domain 2 - the name is derived from Wiskott-Aldrich syndrome protein). Evidence from X-ray crystallography shows that this part of β-thymosins binds to actin in a near-identical manner to that of WH_{2} modules, both adopting as they bind, a conformation which has been referred to as the β-thymosin/WH_{2} fold. β-thymosins may therefore have evolved by addition of novel C-terminal sequence to an ancestral WH_{2} module. However, sequence similarity searches designed to identify present-day WH2 domains fail to recognise β-thymosins, (and vice versa) and the sequence and functional similarities may result from convergent evolution.

=== Biological activities of thymosin β_{4} ===
The archetypical β-thymosin is β_{4} (product in humans of the TMSB4X gene), which is a major cellular constituent in many tissues. Its intracellular concentration may reach as high as 0.5 mM. Following Thymosin α1, β_{4} was the second of the biologically active peptides from Thymosin Fraction 5 to be completely sequenced and synthesized.

Due to its profusion in the cytosol and its ability to bind G-actin but not F-actin, thymosin β_{4} is regarded as the principal actin-sequestering protein in many cell types.

=== Clinical applications ===
Thymosin β_{4} has been tested in multicenter trials sponsored jointly by RegeneRx Biopharmaceuticals Inc (Rockville, MD, USA) and Sigma Tau (Pomezia, Italy) in the United States and Europe in patients with bed sores, ulcers caused by venostasis, and Epidermolysis bullosa simplex and was found to accelerate bed sore and stasis ulcer repair by one month. It has also been tested in patients with chronic neurotrophic corneal epithelial defects and found to promote repair.

Thymosin β_{15} : Levels of human thymosin β_{15} in urine have shown promise as a diagnostic marker for prostate cancer which is sensitive to potential aggressiveness of the tumour

=== Doping in sports ===
Thymosin beta-4 was allegedly used by some players in various Australian football codes.

== β-thymosin repeat proteins ==
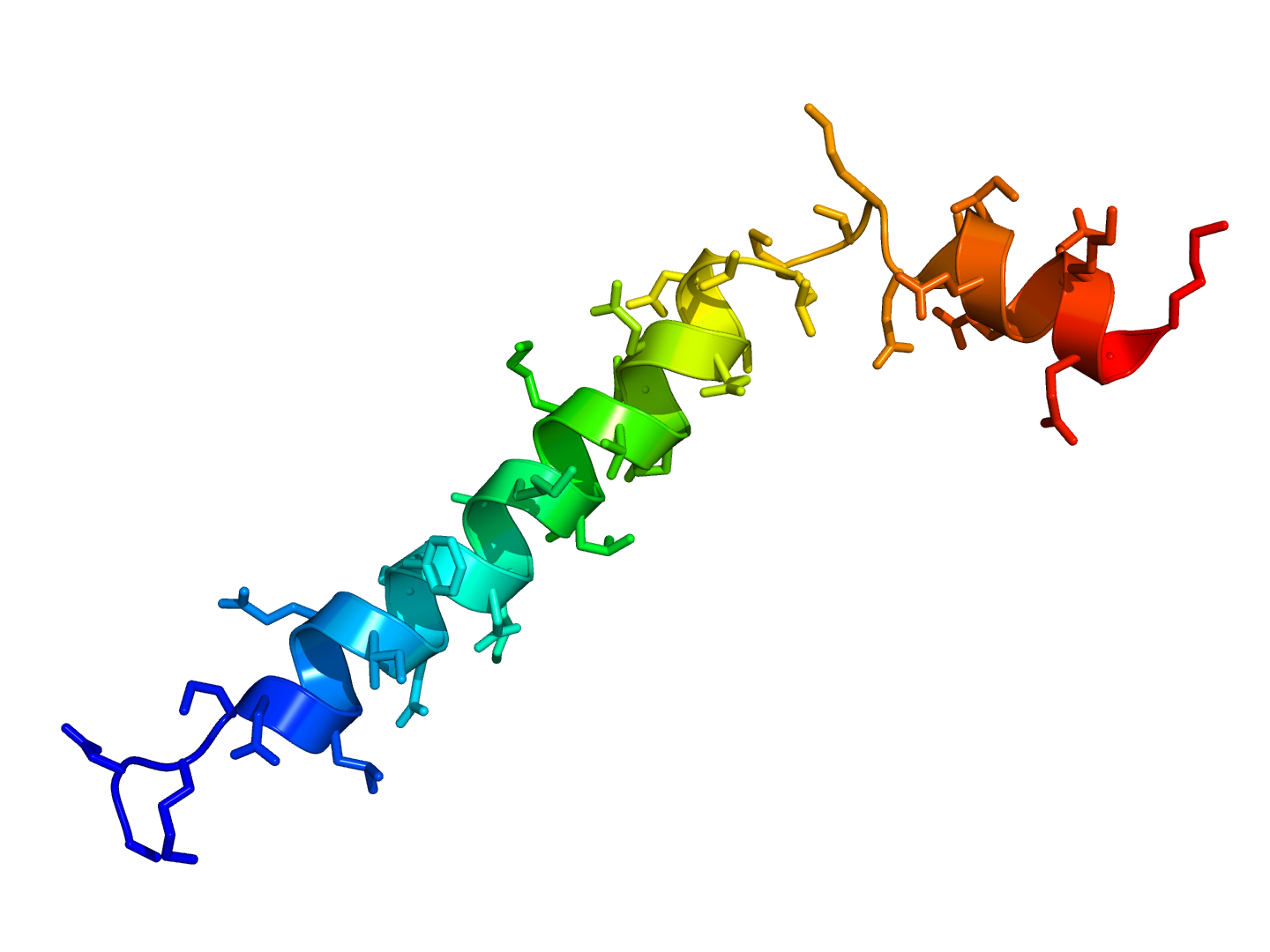
NMR structure of bovine β9-thymosin, the orthologue of human β10. Rainbow coloured where the N-terminus = blue and the C-terminus = red.

=== Distribution ===
These proteins, which typically contain 2-4 repeats of the β-thymosin sequence, are found in all phyla of the animal kingdom, with the probable exception of sponges The sole mammalian example, a dimer in mice, is synthesised by transcriptional read-through between two copies of the mouse β15 gene, each of which is also transcribed separately. A uniquely multiple example is the protein thypedin of Hydra which has 27 repeats of a β-thymosin sequence.

=== Biological activities ===
β-thymosin repeat proteins resemble the monomeric forms in being able to bind to actin, but sequence differences in one example studied, a three-repeat protein Ciboulot of the fruit fly Drosophila, allow binding to ends of actin filaments, an activity which differs from monomer sequestration.

These proteins became of interest in neurobiology with the finding that in the nudibranch (sea slug) Hermissenda crassicornis, the protein Csp24 (conditioned stimulus pathway phosphoprotein-24), with 4 repeats, is involved in simple forms of learning: both one-trial enhancement of the excitability of sensory neurons in the conditioned stimulus pathway, and in multi-trial Pavlovian conditioning. The phosphorylation of Csp24, in common with post-translational modifications of a number of cytoskeleton-related proteins may contribute to actin-filament dynamics underlying structural remodeling of responsive cells.

== See also ==
- Thymosins
  - Thymosin α1
  - Thymosin beta-4
