= Opalescent nudibranch =

The opalescent nudibranch or opalescent sea slug may refer to:

- Hermissenda opalescens, southwestern North America
- Hermissenda crassicornis, northwestern North America
