= Allan L. Goldstein =

American biochemist (born 1937)

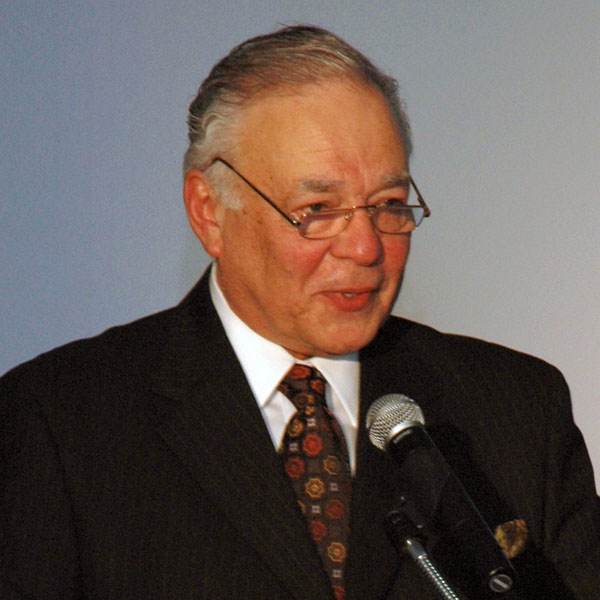
- Born: November 8, 1937; United States
- Education: Wagner College (B.S.); Rutgers University (M.S.) (Ph.D.)
- Known for: Discovery of thymosins
- Scientific career
- Fields: Biochemistry, immunology
- Workplaces: George Washington University Medical School
- Doctoral advisor: Abraham White

Allan L. Goldstein is emeritus professor in the Department of Biochemistry and Molecular Medicine at the George Washington University School of Medicine. He chaired the department from 1978 until March 2009 and was awarded emeritus status in 2013. He is an authority on the thymus gland and the workings of the immune system, and co-discoverer (with Abraham White) of the thymosins, a family of hormone-like peptides isolated from the thymus gland.

== Early life and education ==
Goldstein grew up on Staten Island and received his B.S. degree from Wagner College in 1959 and his M.S. and Ph.D. degrees from Rutgers University, the latter in 1964. He served on the faculty of the Albert Einstein College of Medicine from 1964 to 1972, and as director of the Division of Biochemistry at the University of Texas Medical Branch in Galveston from 1972 through 1978 before accepting the chairmanship of the Department of Biochemistry and Molecular Biology at the George Washington University School of Medicine & Health Sciences, a position he held for 31 years.

== Research ==
Thymosin α1 (TA1), a molecule with immune enhancing properties, was the first of the thymosins to enter clinical trials. It has been approved in China and more than 30 other countries, and has shown great promise in the treatment of severe sepsis, cancer, and a number of other diseases including the potential treatment of cystic fibrosis. Most recently, TA1 has been found to synergize with a check-point inhibitor and further extend the survival of Stage III/IV melanoma patients previously treated with TA1. Thymosin β4 (Tβ4), the second of the thymosins to reach the clinic, has been shown to accelerate wound healing and the remodeling of injured tissues. An injectable form of Tβ4 has been developed for internal indications such as myocardial infarction, stroke and brain trauma. Early Phase 2 trials have been completed in patients with pressure and venostasis ulcers. Two Phase 2/3 trials in patients with dry eye and neurotrophic keratopathy have been completed in the United States with promising results. A third Phase 3 trial in dry eye will begin in 2019. RegeneRx Biopharmaceuticals is developing an injectable form of Tβ4 for internal indications such as myocardial infarction, stroke, multiple sclerosis, brain trauma, and peripheral neuropathy. Dr. Goldstein's research has helped define the role of biological response modifiers in health and disease, and has led to the discovery of important new links between the immune system, the neuroendocrine system and the brain.

== Academic achievements ==
Dr. Goldstein is the author of more than 450 scientific articles in professional journals, the inventor on over 25 U.S. and worldwide patents, and the editor of several books and monographs in the fields of biochemistry, biomedicine, immunology and neuroscience. Over the years, Dr. Goldstein's laboratory has been a center for the training of graduate, medical, and postdoctoral students, many of whom are now continuing and expanding his studies on the role of the thymus in health and disease. Dr. Goldstein has also been a pioneer in medical education, having developed a unique series of distance-education programs presented on the Internet entitled Frontiers in Medicine. This series of lectures and national town forums by leading scientists focused on cutting-edge research. The broadcasts, which were presented live from George Washington University, began in 1997 and were a first for continuing medical education on the Internet. Frontiers in Medicine received the FREDDIE award for best health site at the 1997 American Medical Association Health and Medicine film competition in San Francisco.

== Professional activities ==
Dr. Goldstein was the co-founder and first president and scientific director of the Institute for Advanced Studies in Aging and Geriatric Medicine, a nonprofit research institute that supports research and educational activities. He also served as a member of the board of trustees of the Albert Sabin Vaccine Institute and of the board of directors of the Richard B. and Lynn V. Cheney Cardiovascular Institute. Currently, he serves as the chairman of the board and chief scientific advisor for RegeneRx Biopharmaceuticals, a public company developing novel wound-healing and remodeling therapeutics.

== Honors ==
Dr. Goldstein is the recipient of several awards, including the Career Scientist Award of the Health Research Council, City of New York; the Van Dyke Memorial Award in Pharmacology from the Columbia University College of Physicians and Surgeons; the Copernicus Medal from the University of Kraków; a citation from the U.S. Department of Health, Education and Welfare "in recognition and appreciation of outstanding work in helping to establish a national program on Biological Response Modifiers"; a Doctor of Science degree (honoris causa) from Wagner College; the Decoration of the Order of Vasco Núñez de Balboa, in the rank of Commander, Panama's highest honor, for "contributions directed to the preservation of human life in the world"; the Distinguished Researcher Award of the George Washington University School of Medicine, and the Chevalier des Palmes Académiques, the highest civilian award of France. He was elected to ΑΩΑ, the National Medical Honor Society in 2007.

== See also ==
- Thymosins
- Thymosin α1
- Thymosin beta-4
