= Cyclase-associated protein family =

CAP N-terminal
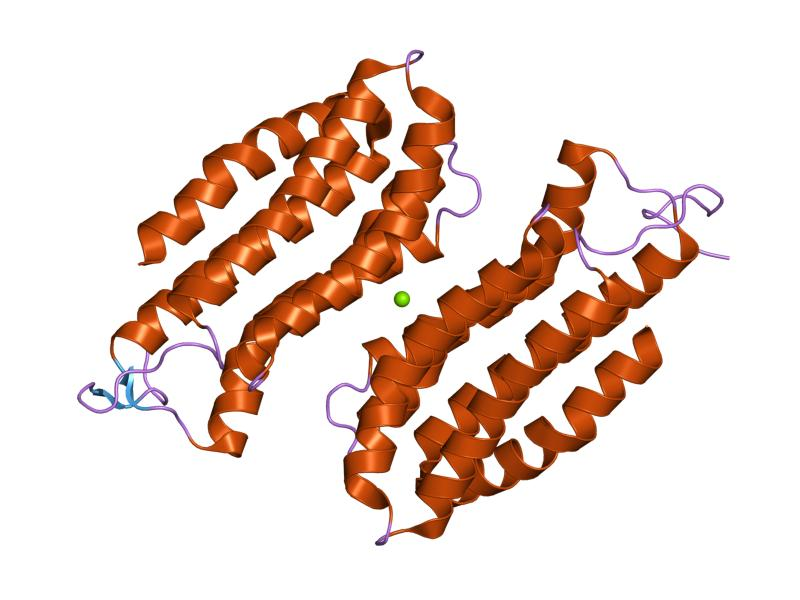
- structure of the n-terminal domain of the adenylyl cyclase-associated protein (cap) from dictyostelium discoideum.

Identifiers
- Symbol: CAP_N
- Pfam: PF01213
- InterPro: IPR013992
- PROSITE: PDOC00835
- SCOP2: 1s0p / SCOPe / SUPFAM
Available protein structures:
- PDB: IPR013992 PF01213 (ECOD; PDBsum)
- AlphaFold: IPR013992; PF01213

The crystal structure of CAP bound to actin monomers. PDB accession = 6fm2

CAP C-terminal
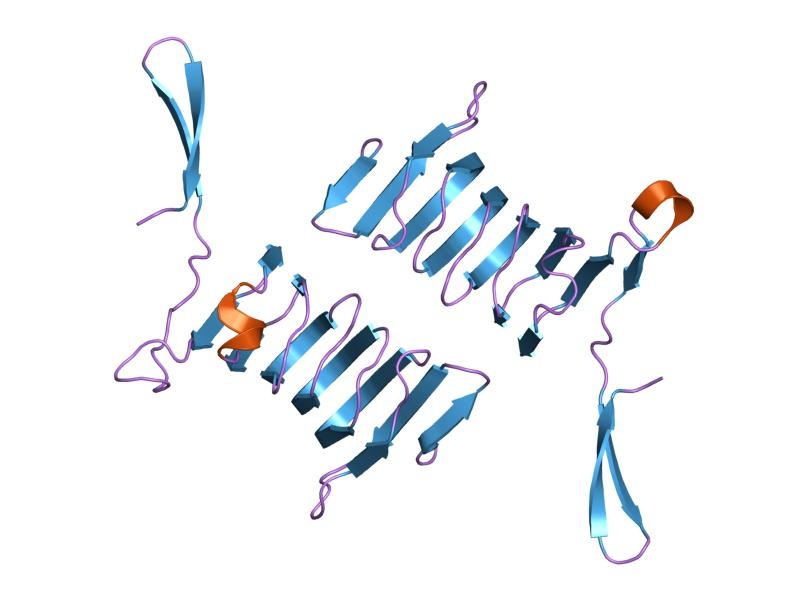
- c-terminal domain of cyclase associated protein with pro 505 replaced by ser (p505s)

Identifiers
- Symbol: CAP_C
- Pfam: PF08603
- Pfam clan: CL0391
- InterPro: IPR013912
- PROSITE: PDOC00835
- SCOP2: 1kq5 / SCOPe / SUPFAM
Available protein structures:
- PDB: IPR013912 PF08603 (ECOD; PDBsum)
- AlphaFold: IPR013912; PF08603

In molecular biology, the cyclase-associated protein family (CAP) is a family of highly conserved actin-binding proteins present in a wide range of organisms including yeast, flies, plants, and mammals. CAPs are multifunctional proteins that contain several structural domains. CAP is involved in species-specific signalling pathways. In Drosophila, CAP functions in Hedgehog-mediated eye development and in establishing oocyte polarity. In Dictyostelium discoideum (social amoeba), CAP is involved in microfilament reorganisation near the plasma membrane in a PIP_{2}-regulated manner and is required to perpetuate the cAMP relay signal to organise fruitbody formation. In plants, CAP is involved in plant signalling pathways required for co-ordinated organ expansion. In yeast, CAP is involved in adenylate cyclase activation, as well as in vesicle trafficking and endocytosis. In both yeast and mammals, CAPs appear to be involved in recycling G-actin monomers from ADF/cofilins for subsequent rounds of filament assembly. In mammals, there are two different CAPs (CAP1 and CAP2) that share 64% amino acid identity.

== Function ==
All CAPs appear to contain a C-terminal actin-binding domain that regulates actin remodelling in response to cellular signals and is required for normal cellular morphology, cell division, growth and locomotion in eukaryotes. CAP directly regulates actin filament dynamics and has been implicated in a number of complex developmental and morphological processes, including mRNA localisation and the establishment of cell polarity. Actin exists both as globular (G) (monomeric) actin subunits and assembled into filamentous (F) actin. In cells, actin cycles between these two forms. Proteins that bind F-actin often regulate F-actin assembly and its interaction with other proteins, while proteins that interact with G-actin often control the availability of unpolymerised actin.

The most conserved domain of CAPs appears to be the ADP-G-actin binding CARP domain which promotes nucleotide exchange of actin monomers from ADP-state back to polymerisable ATP-form. Recently, the crystal structure of CARP domain bound to ADP-actin was determined, which revealed that CAPs have a unique dimeric binding mode to backside of ADP-G-actin monomers. Based on the crystal structure and biochemical work, the C-terminus of CARP domain appears to be important in regulating the binding to ADP-G-actin monomers to CAP, and has a conserved role for nucleotide exchange on actin monomers. Genetic work in Saccharomyches ceravisae revealed that nucleotide exchange performed by CAP is critical for normal organisation of actin cytoskeleton.

A second unique function of CAP in regulating actin dynamics is its ability to specifically bind to pointed ends of cofilin-decorated actin filaments, and rapidly drive their depolymerisation. CAP thus is a specialised protein in recycling of actin monomers, by first rapidly dissociating ADP-actin monomers from the pointed end of actin filaments, then simultaneously driving ADP-to-ATP nucleotide exchange to make actin monomers assembly-competent.

In addition to actin-binding, CAPs can have additional roles, and may act as bifunctional proteins. In Saccharomyces cerevisiae (Baker's yeast), CAP is a component of the adenylyl cyclase complex (Cyr1p) that serves as an effector of Ras during normal cell signalling. S. cerevisiae CAP functions to expose adenylate cyclase binding sites to Ras, thereby enabling adenylate cyclase to be activated by Ras regulatory signals. In Schizosaccharomyces pombe (Fission yeast), CAP is also required for adenylate cyclase activity, but not through the Ras pathway. In both organisms, the N-terminal domain is responsible for adenylate cyclase activation, but the S. cerevisiae and S. pombe N-termini cannot complement one another. Yeast CAPs are unique among the CAP family of proteins, because they are the only ones to directly interact with and activate adenylate cyclase. S. cerevisiae CAP has four major domains. In addition to the N-terminal adenylate cyclase-interacting domain, and the C-terminal actin-binding domain, it possesses two other domains: a proline-rich domain that interacts with Src homology 3 (SH3) domains of specific proteins, and a domain that is responsible for CAP oligomerisation to form multimeric complexes (although oligomerisation appears to involve the N- and C-terminal domains as well). The proline-rich domain interacts with profilin, a protein that catalyses nucleotide exchange on G-actin monomers and promotes addition to barbed ends of filamentous F-actin. Since CAP can bind profilin via a proline-rich domain, and G-actin via a C-terminal domain, it has been suggested that a ternary G-actin/CAP/profilin complex could be formed.

== Structure ==
The N-terminal domain has an all-alpha structure consisting of six helices in a bundle with a left-handed twist and an up-and-down topology.

The C-terminal domain is responsible for G-actin-binding. This domain has a superhelical structure, where the superhelix turns are made of two beta-strands each.
