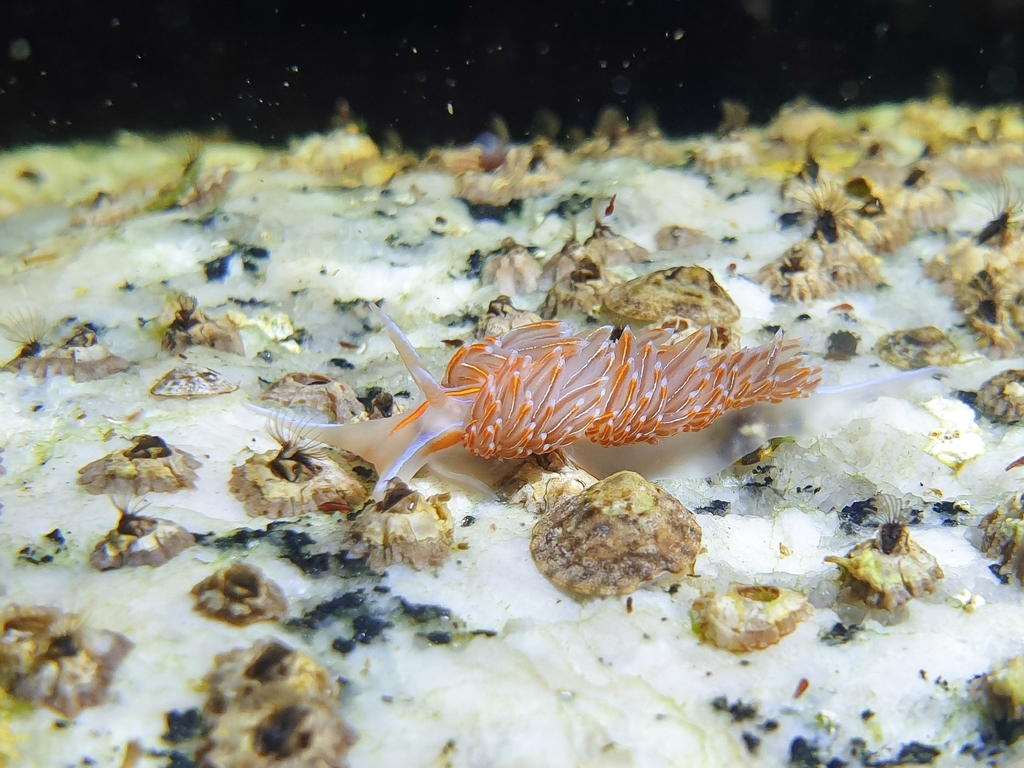

Scientific classification
- Kingdom: Animalia
- Phylum: Mollusca
- Class: Gastropoda
- Order: Nudibranchia
- Suborder: Aeolidacea
- Family: Myrrhinidae
- Genus: Hermissenda
- Species: H. emurai

Binomial name
- Hermissenda emurai Baba, 1937

Synonyms
- Cuthona (Hervia) emurai Baba, 1937

= Hermissenda emurai =

Species of gastropod

Hermissenda emurai is a species of brightly coloured sea slug or nudibranch, a marine gastropod mollusc in the family Myrrhinidae.

== Distribution ==
This nudibranch was described from Niigata, Niigata Prefecture, Sea of Japan, Japan. Its distribution includes Korea and the Russian coast of the Japan Sea (although, no facts confirming distribution in Russia provided). It was (incorrectly) synonymised with Hermissenda crassicornis in 1983.

== Description ==
The species grows to be about 50 mm, or about 2 inches.
