= TMSB15B =

Protein-coding gene in the species Homo sapiens

Identifiers
- Aliases: TMSB15B, Tbeta15b, thymosin beta 15B, TMSNB, TMSB15A, TMSL8
- External IDs: OMIM: 301011; GeneCards: TMSB15B; OMA:TMSB15B - orthologs
Gene ontology
| Molecular function | actin binding; actin monomer binding; molecular function; DNA-binding transcription factor activity, RNA polymerase II-specific |
| Cellular component | cytoskeleton; cytoplasm; cellular component |
| Biological process | actin filament organization; regulation of cell migration; sequestering of actin monomers; positive regulation of cell migration; regulation of transcription by RNA polymerase II |
Sources:Amigo / QuickGO
Orthologs
| Species | Human | Mouse |
| Entrez | 286527 | n/a |
| Ensembl | ENSG00000158427 | n/a |
| UniProt | P0CG34; P0CG35 | n/a |
| RefSeq (mRNA) | NM_001350211; NM_001350212; NM_001350213; NM_194324 | n/a |
| RefSeq (protein) | NP_001337140; NP_001337141; NP_001337142; NP_919305; NP_068832 NP_068832 | n/a |
| Location (UCSC) | n/a | n/a |
| PubMed search | | n/a |
- Wikidata
| View/Edit Human |

Thymosin beta-15B is a protein that, in humans, is encoded by the TMSB15B gene. The protein is identical in aminoacid sequence to Thymosin beta-15A, product of the TMSB15A gene, although synthesis of the two proteins is independently regulated.

== See also ==
- Thymosins
