= TMSB10 =

Protein-coding gene in the species Homo sapiens

Identifiers
- Aliases: TMSB10, MIG12, TB10, thymosin beta 10
- External IDs: OMIM: 188399; GeneCards: TMSB10; OMA:TMSB10 - orthologs

Gene location (Human)
Chr.	Chromosome 2 (human)
Band	2p11.2	Start	84,905,656 bp
Band	2p11.2	End	84,906,671 bp
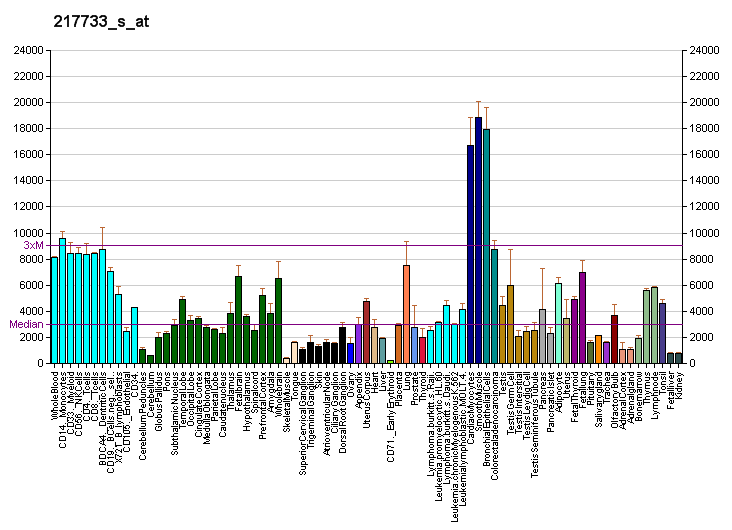
RNA expression pattern
Bgee	Human / Mouse (ortholog); Top expressed in: monocyte; mucosa of transverse colon; granulocyte; ganglionic eminence; stromal cell of endometrium; right lung; upper lobe of left lung; mucosa of sigmoid colon; tibial nerve; Achilles tendon / n/a; More reference expression data
BioGPS	More reference expression data
Gene ontology
Molecular function	actin binding; protein binding; actin monomer binding
Cellular component	cytoskeleton; cytoplasm
Biological process	actin filament organization; regulation of cell migration; sequestering of actin monomers
Sources:Amigo / QuickGO
Orthologs
Species	Human	Mouse
Entrez	9168	n/a
Ensembl	ENSG00000034510	n/a
UniProt	P63313	n/a
RefSeq (mRNA)	NM_021103	n/a
RefSeq (protein)	NP_066926	n/a
Location (UCSC)	Chr 2: 84.91 – 84.91 Mb	n/a
PubMed search		n/a
- Wikidata
View/Edit Human

Thymosin beta-10 is a protein that in humans is encoded by the TMSB10 gene. TMSB10 is a member of the beta-thymosin family of peptides.

TMSB10 plays an important role in the organization of the cytoskeleton. Binds to and sequesters actin monomers (G actin) and therefore inhibits actin polymerization (By similarity).
