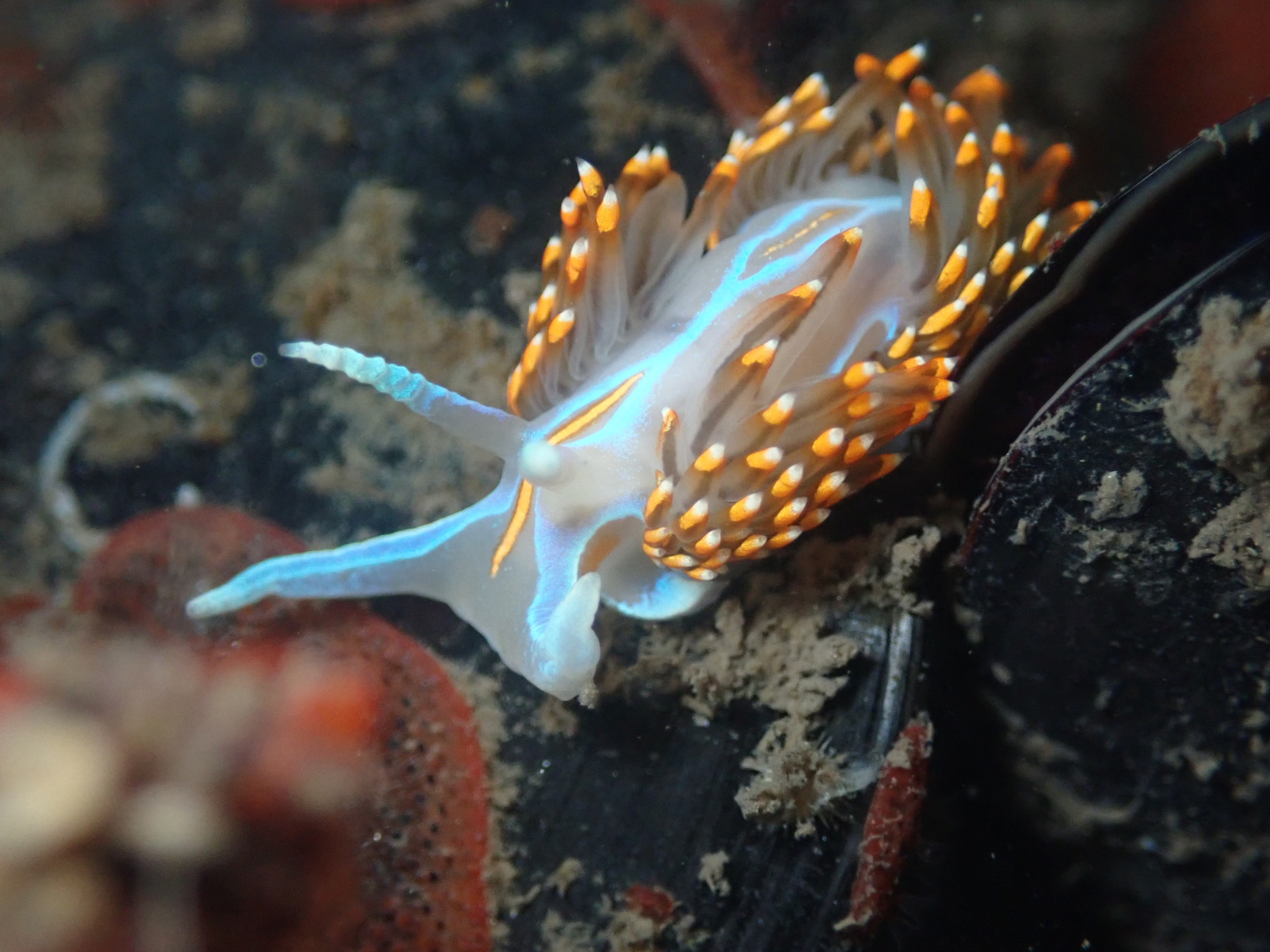
- Hermissenda opalescens in Twin Lakes, California

Scientific classification
- Kingdom: Animalia
- Phylum: Mollusca
- Class: Gastropoda
- Order: Nudibranchia
- Suborder: Aeolidacea
- Family: Myrrhinidae
- Genus: Hermissenda
- Species: H. opalescens

Binomial name
- Hermissenda opalescens Cooper, 1863

= Hermissenda opalescens =

Species of class Gastropoda

Hermissenda opalescens, also known as the opalescent nudibranch or opalescent sea slug, is a species of brightly coloured sea slug or nudibranch, a marine gastropod mollusc in the family Facelinidae.

== Distribution ==
This nudibranch was described from San Diego, California, United States. It has been reported from Northern California, to Punta Eugenia, Mexico. Its distribution overlaps with Hermissenda crassicornis in Northern California and this latter species is found north to Alaska. These two species were routinely treated as a single species during the last 90 years.

The species has also been observed in Bahia de los Angeles, Gulf of California.

== Habitat ==
This sea slug is found in various habitats, including the intertidal zone of rocky shores, but also in bays and estuaries.

== Description ==
The species grows to be about 50 mm, or about 2 inches.

This slug has been treated as a model organism and used in studies into classical conditioning, memory consolidation and associative learning, the structure of neural circuits and neural physiology. It has also been used to investigate ultrastructure and anatomy, larval and reproductive ecology, behavioral ecology and pharmacology and toxicology including studies into Beta thymosins. Unfortunately these studies did not differentiate between the three species of Hermissenda.

== Life habits ==
This nudibranch feeds on hydroids and other marine organisms such as ascidians and sea anemones. It sometimes attacks other nudibranchs, and will eat smaller specimens of its own species. It is host to the ectoparasites Halicyclops thysanotus Wilson C.B., 1935 and Hemicyclops thysanotus Wilson C.B., 1935.
