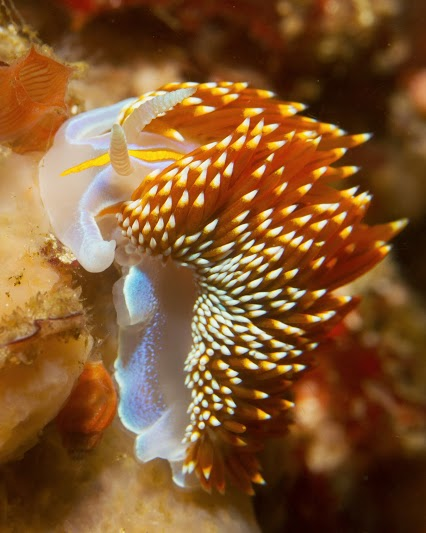
- Closeup of Hermissenda opalescens off Monterey, California

Scientific classification
- Kingdom: Animalia
- Phylum: Mollusca
- Class: Gastropoda
- Order: Nudibranchia
- Suborder: Aeolidacea
- Family: Myrrhinidae
- Genus: Hermissenda; Bergh, 1879

Type species
- Aeolis opalescens J. G. Cooper, 1863

= Hermissenda =

Genus of gastropods

Hermissenda is a genus of sea slugs, aeolid nudibranchs, marine gastropod molluscs in the family Facelinidae.

== Species ==
Species within the genus Hermissenda include:

- Hermissenda crassicornis (Eschscholtz, 1831)
- Hermissenda emurai (Baba, 1937)
- Hermissenda opalescens (Cooper, 1863)
