= Thymosin beta-4 =

Mammalian protein found in Homo sapiens

TMSB4X

Identifiers
- Aliases: TMSB4X, FX, PTMB4, TB4X, TMSB4, thymosin beta 4, X-linked, thymosin beta 4 X-linked
- External IDs: OMIM: 300159; GeneCards: TMSB4X
Available structures
| PDB | Human UniProt search: PDBe RCSB |
| PDB | List of PDB id codes 4PL7, 4PL8 |

Gene location (Human)
| Chr. | X chromosome (human) |
| Band | Xp22.2 | Start | 12,975,110 bp |
| Band | Xp22.2 | End | 12,977,227 bp |
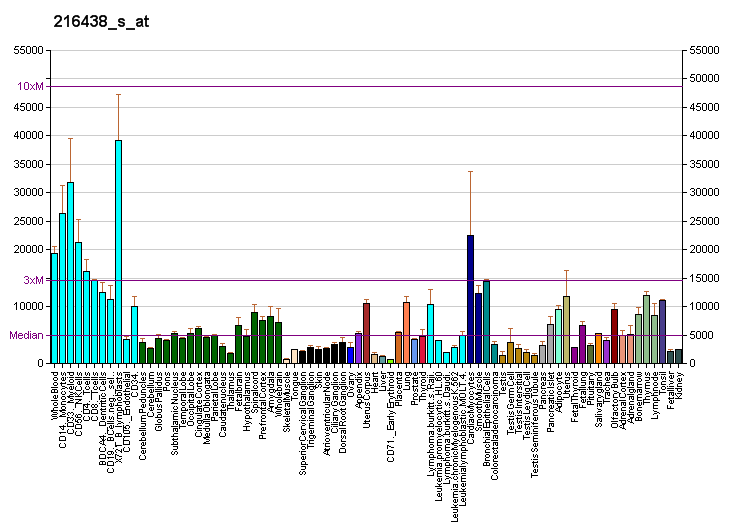
RNA expression pattern
| Bgee | Human / Mouse (ortholog); Top expressed in: monocyte; stromal cell of endometrium; ganglionic eminence; lymph node; granulocyte; gallbladder; ventricular zone; appendix; right lung; upper lobe of left lung / n/a; More reference expression data |
| BioGPS | More reference expression data |
Gene ontology
| Molecular function | actin binding; protein binding; RNA binding; actin monomer binding; enzyme binding |
| Cellular component | cytoskeleton; platelet alpha granule lumen; intracellular anatomical structure; nucleus; cytoplasm; cytosol; extracellular region |
| Biological process | platelet degranulation; actin filament organization; cytoplasmic sequestering of NF-kappaB; negative regulation of NF-kappaB transcription factor activity; tumor necrosis factor-mediated signaling pathway; sequestering of actin monomers; positive regulation of blood vessel endothelial cell migration; regulation of inflammatory response; regulation of NIK/NF-kappaB signaling; negative regulation of NIK/NF-kappaB signaling; negative regulation of RNA polymerase II regulatory region sequence-specific DNA binding; positive regulation of proton-transporting ATP synthase activity, rotational mechanism; positive regulation of endothelial cell chemotaxis; positive regulation of ATP biosynthetic process; osteoblast differentiation; regulation of cell migration |
Sources:Amigo / QuickGO
Orthologs
| Databases | NCBI: entry; OMA: entry |
| Species | Human | Mouse |
| Entrez | 7114 | n/a |
| Ensembl | ENSG00000205542 | n/a |
| UniProt | P62328 | n/a |
| RefSeq (mRNA) | NM_021109 | n/a |
| RefSeq (protein) | NP_066932 | n/a |
| Location (UCSC) | Chr X: 12.98 – 12.98 Mb | n/a |
| PubMed search | | n/a |
- Wikidata
| View/Edit Human |

Thymosin beta-4 is a protein that in humans is encoded by the TMSB4X gene. Recommended INN (International Nonproprietary Name) for an acetylated form of thymosin beta-4 is 'timbetasin', as published by the World Health Organization (WHO).

The protein consists (in humans) of 44 amino acids (sequence: MSDKPDMAEI EKFDKSKLKK TETQEKNPLP SKETIEQEKQ AGES) and has a molecular weight of 5,053 g/mol.

Thymosin-β_{4} is a major cellular constituent in many tissues. Its intracellular concentration may reach as high as 0.5 mM. Following Thymosin α1, β_{4} was the second of the biologically active peptides from Thymosin Fraction 5 to be completely sequenced and synthesized.

== Function ==
This gene encodes an actin sequestering protein which plays a role in regulation of actin polymerization. The protein is also involved in cell proliferation, migration, and differentiation. This gene escapes X inactivation and has a homolog on chromosome Y (TMSB4Y).

=== Development ===
In at least one knock-out study of the gene, mice without thymosin β_{4} still had apparently normal embryonic development, and were fertile as adults (in contrast to an earlier knock-out study). This calls into some question the developmental importance of the protein.

=== Actin binding ===
Thymosin β_{4} was initially perceived as a thymic hormone. However this changed when it was discovered that it forms a 1:1 complex with G (globular) actin, and is present at high concentration in a wide range of mammalian cell types. When appropriate, G-actin monomers polymerize to form F (filamentous) actin, which, together with other proteins that bind to actin, comprise cellular microfilaments. Formation by G-actin of the complex with β-thymosin (= "sequestration") opposes this.

Due to its profusion in the cytosol and its ability to bind G-actin but not F-actin, thymosin β_{4} is regarded as the principal actin-sequestering protein in many cell types. Thymosin β_{4} functions like a buffer for monomeric actin as represented in the following reaction:

F-actin ↔ G-actin + Thymosin β_{4} ↔ G-actin/Thymosin β_{4}

Release of G-actin monomers from thymosin β_{4} occurs as part of the mechanism that drives actin polymerization in the normal function of the cytoskeleton in cell morphology and cell motility.

The sequence LKKTET, which starts at residue 17 of the 43-aminoacid sequence of thymosin beta-4, and is strongly conserved between all β-thymosins, together with a similar sequence in WH2 domains, is frequently referred to as "the actin-binding motif" of these proteins, although modelling based on X-ray crystallography has shown that essentially the entire length of the β-thymosin sequence interacts with actin in the actin-thymosin complex.

=== "Moonlighting" ===
In addition to its intracellular role as the major actin-sequestering molecule in cells of many multicellular animals, thymosin β_{4} shows a remarkably diverse range of effects when present in the fluid surrounding animal tissue cells. Taken together, these effects suggest that thymosin has a general role in tissue regeneration. This has suggested a variety of possible therapeutic applications, and several have now been extended to animal models and human clinical trials.

It is considered unlikely that thymosin β_{4} exerts all these effects via intracellular sequestration of G-actin. This would require its uptake by cells, and moreover, in most cases the cells affected already have substantial intracellular concentrations.

The diverse activities related to tissue repair may depend on interactions with receptors quite distinct from actin and possessing extracellular ligand-binding domains. Such multi-tasking by, or "partner promiscuity" of, proteins has been referred to as protein moonlighting. Proteins such as thymosins which lack stable folded structure in aqueous solution, are known as intrinsically unstructured proteins (IUPs). Because IUPs acquire specific folded structures only on binding to their partner proteins, they offer special possibilities for interaction with multiple partners. A candidate extracellular receptor of high affinity for thymosin β_{4} is the β subunit of cell surface-located ATP synthase, which would allow extracellular thymosin to signal via a purinergic receptor.

Some of the multiple activities of thymosin β_{4} unrelated to actin may be mediated by a tetrapeptide enzymically cleaved from its N-terminus, N-acetyl-ser-asp-lys-pro, brand names Seraspenide or Goralatide, best known as an inhibitor of the proliferation of haematopoietic (blood-cell precursor) stem cells of bone marrow.

=== Tissue regeneration ===
Work with cell cultures and experiments with animals have shown that administration of thymosin β_{4} can promote migration of cells, formation of blood vessels, maturation of stem cells, survival of various cell types and lowering of the production of pro-inflammatory cytokines. These multiple properties have provided the impetus for a worldwide series of on-going clinical trials of potential effectiveness of thymosin β_{4} in promoting repair of wounds in skin, cornea and heart.

Such tissue-regenerating properties of thymosin β_{4} may ultimately contribute to repair of human heart muscle damaged by heart disease and heart attack. In mice, administration of thymosin β_{4} has been shown to stimulate formation of new heart muscle cells from otherwise inactive precursor cells present in the outer lining of adult hearts, to induce migration of these cells into heart muscle and recruit new blood vessels within the muscle.

=== Anti-inflammatory role for sulfoxide ===
In 1999 researchers in Glasgow University found that an oxidised derivative of thymosin β_{4} (the sulfoxide, in which an oxygen atom is added to the methionine near the N-terminus) exerted several potentially anti-inflammatory effects on neutrophil leucocytes. It promoted their dispersion from a focus, inhibited their response to a small peptide (F-Met-Leu-Phe) which attracts them to sites of bacterial infection and lowered their adhesion to endothelial cells. (Adhesion to endothelial cells of blood vessel walls is pre-requisite for these cells to leave the bloodstream and invade infected tissue). A possible anti-inflammatory role for the β_{4} sulfoxide was supported by the group's finding that it counteracted artificially-induced inflammation in mice.

The group had first identified the thymosin sulfoxide as an active factor in culture fluid of cells responding to treatment with a steroid hormone, suggesting that its formation might form part of the mechanism by which steroids exert anti-inflammatory effects. Extracellular thymosin β_{4} would be readily oxidised to the sulfoxide in vivo at sites of inflammation, by the respiratory burst.

=== Terminal deoxynucleotidyl transferase ===
Thymosin β_{4} induces the activity of the enzyme terminal deoxynucleotidyl transferase in populations of thymocytes (thymus-derived lymphocytes). This suggests that the peptide may contribute to the maturation of these cells.

== Clinical significance ==
Tβ4 has been studied in a number of clinical trials.

In phase 2 trials with patients having pressure ulcers, venous pressure ulcers, and epidermolysis bullosa, Tβ4 accelerated the rate of repair. It was also found to be safe and well tolerated.

In human clinical trials, Tβ4 improves the conditions of dry eye and neurotrophic keratopathy with effects lasting long after the end of treatment.

== Doping in sports ==
Thymosin beta-4 is considered a performance-enhancing substance and is banned in sports by the World Anti-Doping Agency due to its effect of aiding soft tissue recovery and enabling higher training loads. It was central to two controversies in Australia in the 2010s which saw a large proportion of the playing lists from two professional football clubs – the Cronulla-Sutherland Sharks of the National Rugby League and the Essendon Football Club of the Australian Football League – found guilty of doping and suspended from playing; in both cases, the players were administered thymosin beta-4 in a program organised by sports scientist Stephen Dank.

== Interactions ==
TMSB4X has been shown to interact with ACTA1 and ACTG1.

== See also ==
- Beta thymosins
- Thymosin beta-4, Y-chromosomal
- Thymosins
- TB-500
- Ac-SDKP
