= Actin, cytoplasmic 2 =

Protein-coding gene in the species Homo sapiens

ACTG1
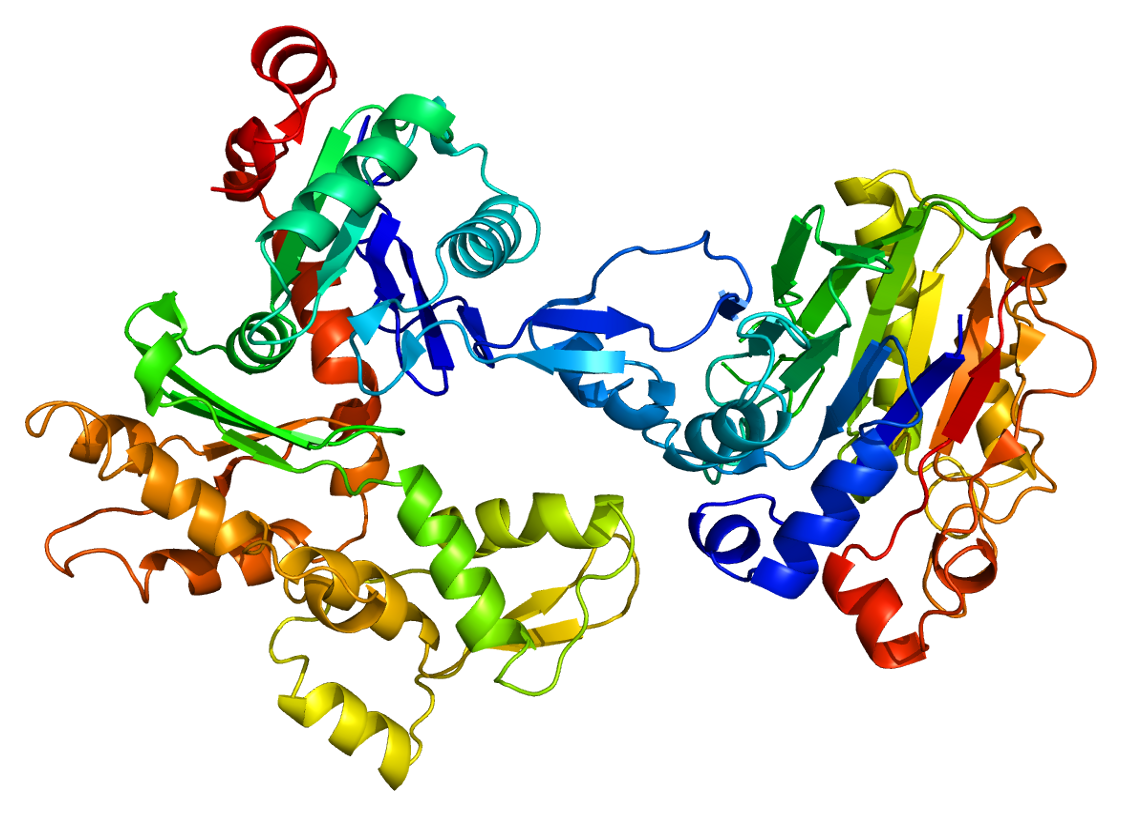

Identifiers
- Aliases: ACTG1, ACT, ACTG, BRWS2, DFNA20, DFNA26, HEL-176, actin gamma 1
- External IDs: OMIM: 102560; MGI: 87906; GeneCards: ACTG1
Available structures
PDB	Ortholog search: PDBe RCSB
PDB	List of PDB id codes 5JLH

Gene location (Human)
Chr.	Chromosome 17 (human)
Band	17q25.3	Start	81,509,413 bp
Band	17q25.3	End	81,523,847 bp

Gene location (Mouse)
Chr.	Chromosome 11 (mouse)
Band	11|11 E2	Start	120,236,516 bp
Band	11|11 E2	End	120,239,368 bp
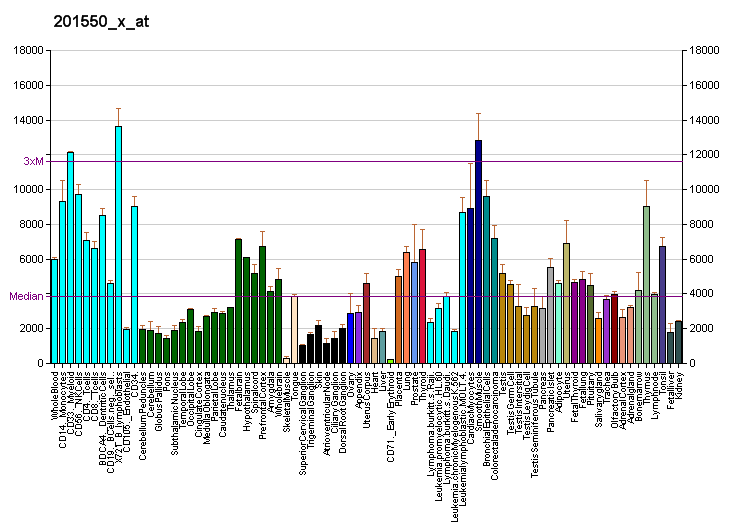

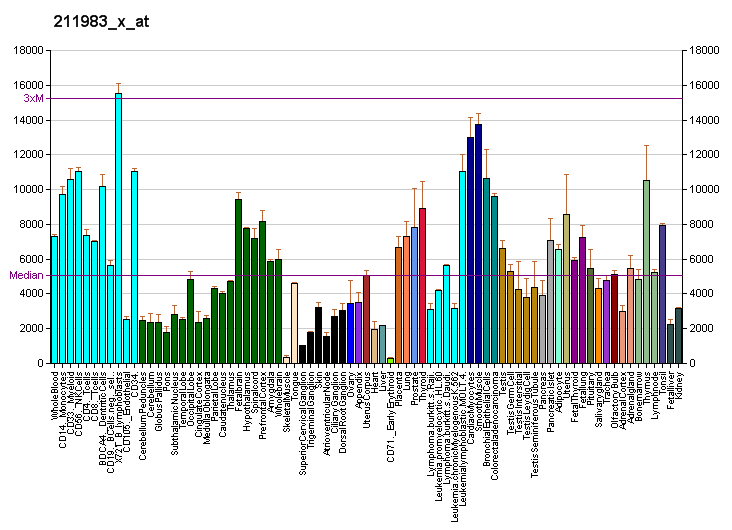

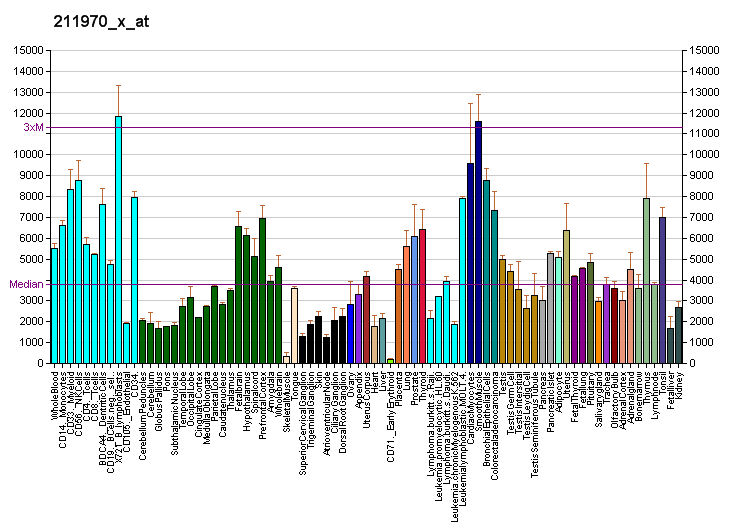
RNA expression pattern
Bgee	Human / Mouse (ortholog); Top expressed in: mucosa of ileum; ventricular zone; amniotic fluid; embryo; ganglionic eminence; parietal pleura; epithelium of nasopharynx; visceral pleura; spinal ganglia; pericardium / Top expressed in: granulocyte; ganglionic eminence; neural tube; mesencephalon; dentate gyrus of hippocampal formation granule cell; placenta; primary visual cortex; epiblast; blastocyst; stomach; More reference expression data
BioGPS	More reference expression data
Gene ontology
Molecular function	nucleotide binding; protein binding; ATP binding; ubiquitin protein ligase binding; identical protein binding; structural constituent of cytoskeleton; profilin binding
Cellular component	focal adhesion; nucleus; dense body; cytoplasm; membrane; cytosol; extracellular exosome; blood microparticle; plasma membrane; cytoskeleton; extracellular matrix; extracellular space; actin cytoskeleton; myofibril; filamentous actin; myelin sheath; actin filament
Biological process	cell junction assembly; ephrin receptor signaling pathway; platelet aggregation; Fc-gamma receptor signaling pathway involved in phagocytosis; retina homeostasis; vascular endothelial growth factor receptor signaling pathway; membrane organization; sarcomere organization
Sources:Amigo / QuickGO
Orthologs
Databases	NCBI: entry; OMA: entry
Species	Human	Mouse
Entrez	71	11465
Ensembl	ENSG00000184009	ENSMUSG00000062825
UniProt	P63261	P63260
RefSeq (mRNA)	NM_001199954; NM_001614	NM_009609; NM_001313923
RefSeq (protein)	NP_001186883; NP_001605	NP_001300852; NP_033739
Location (UCSC)	Chr 17: 81.51 – 81.52 Mb	Chr 11: 120.24 – 120.24 Mb
PubMed search
- Wikidata
View/Edit Human	View/Edit Mouse

Actin, cytoplasmic 2, or gamma-actin is a protein that in humans is encoded by the ACTG1 gene. Gamma-actin is widely expressed in cellular cytoskeletons of many tissues; in adult striated muscle cells, gamma-actin is localized to Z-discs and costamere structures, which are responsible for force transduction and transmission in muscle cells. Mutations in ACTG1 have been associated with nonsyndromic hearing loss and Baraitser-Winter syndrome, as well as susceptibility of adolescent patients to vincristine toxicity.

== Structure ==
Human gamma-actin is 41.8 kDa in molecular weight and 375 amino acids in length. Actins are highly conserved proteins that are involved in various types of cell motility, and maintenance of the cytoskeleton. In vertebrates, three main groups of actin paralogs, alpha, beta, and gamma, have been identified.

The alpha actins are found in muscle tissues and are a major constituent of the sarcomere contractile apparatus. The beta and gamma actins co-exist in most cell types as components of the cytoskeleton, and as mediators of internal cell motility. Actin, gamma 1, encoded by this gene, is found in non-muscle cells in the cytoplasm, and in muscle cells at costamere structures, or transverse points of cell-cell adhesion that run perpendicular to the long axis of myocytes.

== Function ==
In myocytes, sarcomeres adhere to the sarcolemma via costameres, which align at Z-discs and M-lines. The two primary cytoskeletal components of costameres are desmin intermediate filaments and gamma-actin microfilaments. It has been shown that gamma-actin interacting with another costameric protein dystrophin is critical for costameres forming mechanically strong links between the cytoskeleton and the sarcolemmal membrane. Additional studies have shown that gamma-actin colocalizes with alpha-actinin and GFP-labeled gamma actin localized to Z-discs, whereas GFP-alpha-actin localized to pointed ends of thin filaments, indicating that gamma actin specifically localizes to Z-discs in striated muscle cells.

During development of myocytes, gamma actin is thought to play a role in the organization and assembly of developing sarcomeres, evidenced in part by its early colocalization with alpha-actinin. Gamma-actin is eventually replaced by sarcomeric alpha-actin isoforms, with low levels of gamma-actin persisting in adult myocytes which associate with Z-disc and costamere domains.

Insights into the function of gamma-actin in muscle have come from studies employing transgenesis. In a skeletal muscle-specific knockout of gamma-actin in mice, these animals showed no detectable abnormalities in development; however, knockout mice showed muscle weakness and fiber necrosis, along with decreased isometric twitch force, disrupted intrafibrillar and interfibrillar connections among myocytes, and myopathy.

== Clinical significance ==
An autosomal dominant mutation in ACTG1 in the DFNA20/26 locus at 17q25-qter was identified in patients with hearing loss. A Thr278Ile mutation was identified in helix 9 of gamma-actin protein, which is predicted to alter protein structure. This study identified the first disease causing mutation in gamma-actin and underlies the importance of gamma-actin as structural elements of the inner ear hair cells. Since then, other ACTG1 mutations have been linked to nonsyndromic hearing loss, including Met305Thr.

A missense mutation in ACTG1 at Ser155Phe has also been identified in patients with Baraitser-Winter syndrome, which is a developmental disorder characterized by congenital ptosis, excessively-arched eyebrows, hypertelorism, ocular colobomata, lissencephaly, short stature, seizures and hearing loss.

Differential expression of ACTG1 mRNA was also identified in patients with Sporadic Amyotrophic Lateral Sclerosis, a devastating disease with unknown causality, using a sophisticated bioinformatics approach employing Affymetrix long-oligonucleotide BaFL methods.

Single nucleotide polymorphisms in ACTG1 have been associated with vincristine toxicity, which is part of the standard treatment regimen for childhood acute lymphoblastic leukemia. Neurotoxicity was more frequent in patients that were ACTG1 Gly310Ala mutation carriers, suggesting that this may play a role in patient outcomes from vincristine treatment.

== Interactions ==
ACTG1 has been shown to interact with:

- CAP1,
- DMD,
- TMSB4X, and
- Plectin.

== See also ==
- Actin
