= Thymosin beta-4, Y-chromosomal =

Protein-coding gene in the species Homo sapiens

TMSB4Y

Identifiers
- Aliases: TMSB4Y, TB4Y, thymosin beta 4, Y-linked, thymosin beta 4 Y-linked
- External IDs: OMIM: 400017; GeneCards: TMSB4Y

Gene location (Human)
Chr.	Y chromosome (human)
Band	Yq11.221	Start	13,703,899 bp
Band	Yq11.221	End	13,706,024 bp
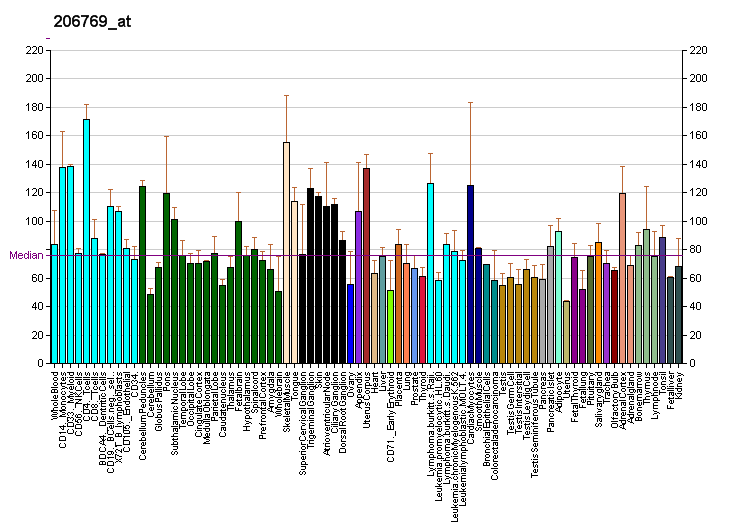
RNA expression pattern
Bgee	Human / Mouse (ortholog); Top expressed in: gonad; corpus callosum; testicle; rectum; mucosa of transverse colon; Brodmann area 9; ventricular zone; prostate; ganglionic eminence; putamen / n/a; More reference expression data
BioGPS	More reference expression data
Gene ontology
Molecular function	actin binding; protein binding; actin monomer binding
Cellular component	cytoskeleton; cytoplasm; nucleus; cytosol
Biological process	sequestering of actin monomers; regulation of actin polymerization or depolymerization; actin filament organization; regulation of cell migration; osteoblast differentiation
Sources:Amigo / QuickGO
Orthologs
Databases	NCBI: entry; OMA: entry
Species	Human	Mouse
Entrez	9087	n/a
Ensembl	ENSG00000154620	n/a
UniProt	O14604	n/a
RefSeq (mRNA)	NM_004202	n/a
RefSeq (protein)	NP_004193	n/a
Location (UCSC)	Chr Y: 13.7 – 13.71 Mb	n/a
PubMed search		n/a
- Wikidata
View/Edit Human

Thymosin beta-4, Y-chromosomal is a protein that in humans is encoded by the TMSB4Y gene.

The protein consists (in humans) of 44 amino acids (msdkpgmaei ekfdksklkk tetqeknpls sketieqerq ages) MolWt 4881.

== Function ==
This gene lies within the male specific region of chromosome Y. Its homolog on chromosome X (thymosin beta-4) escapes X inactivation and encodes an actin sequestering protein.
