= CAP1 =

Protein-coding gene in humans

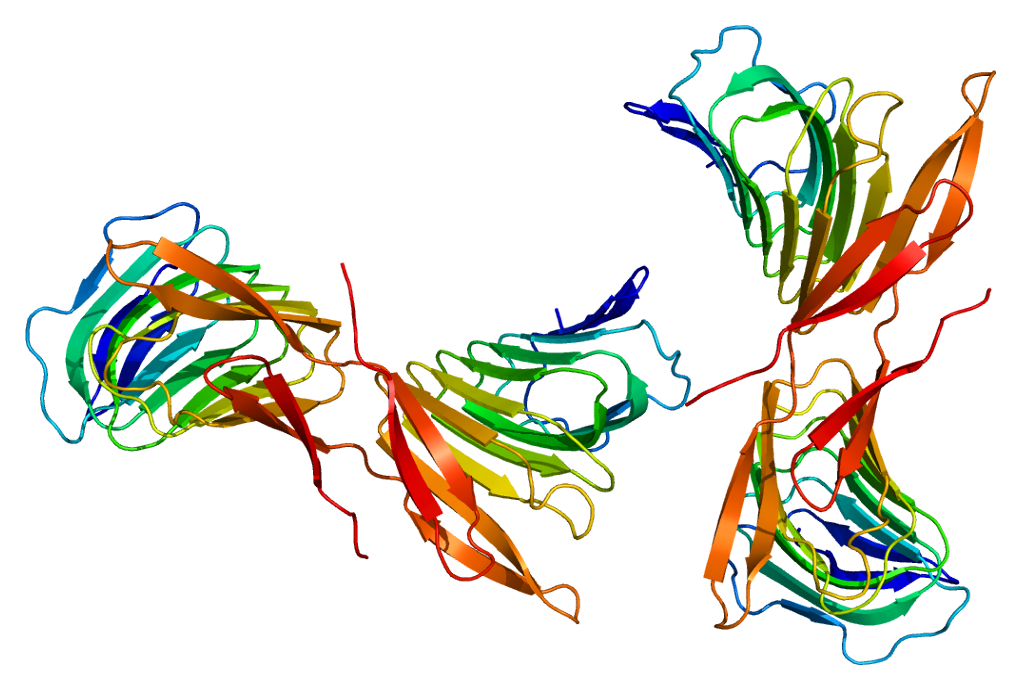

Identifiers
- Aliases: CAP1, CAP, CAP1-PEN, CAP, adenylate cyclase-associated protein 1 (yeast), adenylate cyclase associated protein 1
- External IDs: OMIM: 617801; MGI: 88262; GeneCards: CAP1
Available structures
PDB	Ortholog search: PDBe RCSB
PDB	List of PDB id codes 1K8F

Gene location (Mouse)
Chr.	Chromosome 4 (mouse)
Band	4|4 D2.2	Start	122,752,840 bp
Band	4|4 D2.2	End	122,779,849 bp
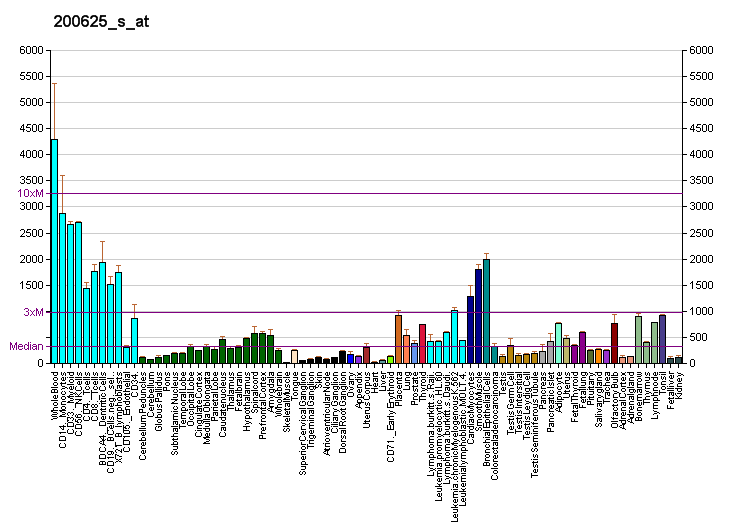

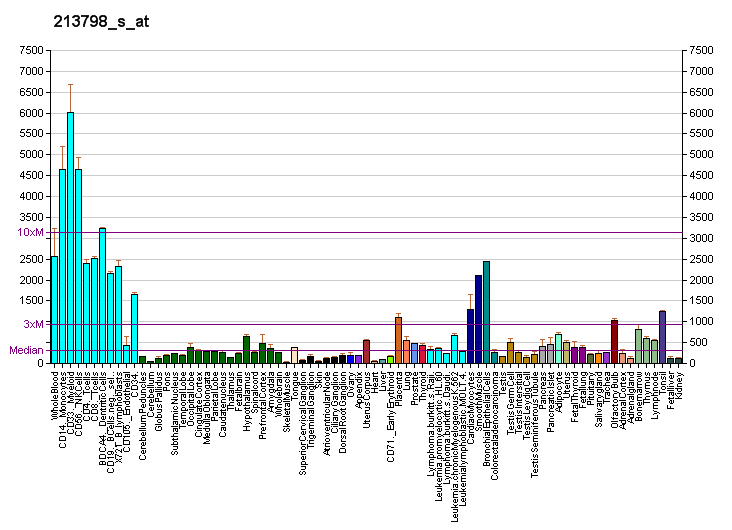
RNA expression pattern
Bgee	Human / Mouse (ortholog); n/a / Top expressed in: granulocyte; lateral septal nucleus; dentate gyrus of hippocampal formation granule cell; superior frontal gyrus; transitional epithelium of urinary bladder; tibiofemoral joint; cervix; yolk sac; decidua; lip
BioGPS	More reference expression data
Gene ontology
Molecular function	adenylate cyclase binding; actin binding
Cellular component	cytoplasm; plasma membrane; extracellular exosome; membrane; focal adhesion; cortical actin cytoskeleton; extracellular region; extracellular space; azurophil granule lumen
Biological process	establishment or maintenance of cell polarity; ameboidal-type cell migration; receptor-mediated endocytosis; actin cytoskeleton organization; cytoskeleton organization; signal transduction; activation of adenylate cyclase activity; cell morphogenesis; actin polymerization or depolymerization; neutrophil degranulation; regulation of adenylate cyclase activity
Sources:Amigo / QuickGO
Orthologs
Databases	NCBI: entry; OMA: entry
Species	Human	Mouse
Entrez	10487	12331
Ensembl	ENSG00000131236	ENSMUSG00000028656
UniProt	Q01518; Q5T0R9	P40124
RefSeq (mRNA)	NM_001105530; NM_006367; NM_001330502	NM_001301067; NM_007598; NM_001358035; NM_001358036
RefSeq (protein)	NP_001099000; NP_001317431; NP_006358; NP_001337404; NP_001337405 NP_001337406; NP_001337407; NP_001337408; NP_001337409; NP_001337410; NP_001337411; NP_001337412; NP_001337413; NP_001337414	NP_001287996; NP_031624; NP_001344964; NP_001344965
Location (UCSC)	n/a	Chr 4: 122.75 – 122.78 Mb
PubMed search
- Wikidata
View/Edit Human	View/Edit Mouse

Adenylyl cyclase-associated protein 1 is an enzyme that in humans is encoded by the CAP1 gene.

The protein encoded by this gene is related to the Saccharomyces cerevisiae CAP protein, which is involved in the cyclic AMP pathway. The human protein is able to interact with other molecules of the same protein, as well as with CAP2 and actin.

== Interactions ==
CAP1 has been shown to interact with ACTG1 and CAP2.

== See also ==
- Adenylyl cyclase
