= TMSB15A =

Protein-coding gene in the species Homo sapiens

Identifiers
- Aliases: TMSB15A, TMSB15, TMSB15B, TMSL8, TMSNB, Tb15, TbNB, thymosin beta 15a
- External IDs: OMIM: 300939; GeneCards: TMSB15A; OMA:TMSB15A - orthologs

Gene location (Human)
Chr.	X chromosome (human)
Band	Xq22.1	Start	102,513,682 bp
Band	Xq22.1	End	102,516,739 bp
RNA expression pattern
Bgee	Human / Mouse (ortholog); Top expressed in: embryo; ganglionic eminence; ventricular zone; testicle; gonad; periodontal fiber; right lung; sperm; hair follicle; glomerulus / n/a; More reference expression data
BioGPS	n/a
Gene ontology
Molecular function	actin binding; actin monomer binding; molecular function; DNA-binding transcription factor activity, RNA polymerase II-specific
Cellular component	cytoskeleton; cytoplasm; cellular component
Biological process	actin filament organization; regulation of cell migration; sequestering of actin monomers; positive regulation of cell migration; regulation of transcription by RNA polymerase II
Sources:Amigo / QuickGO
Orthologs
Species	Human	Mouse
Entrez	11013	n/a
Ensembl	ENSG00000158164	n/a
UniProt	P0CG34; P0CG35	n/a
RefSeq (mRNA)	NM_021992	n/a
RefSeq (protein)	NP_001337140; NP_001337141; NP_001337142; NP_919305; NP_068832 NP_068832	n/a
Location (UCSC)	Chr X: 102.51 – 102.52 Mb	n/a
PubMed search		n/a
- Wikidata
View/Edit Human

Thymosin beta-15A is a protein that in humans is encoded by the TMSB15A gene.

== See also ==
- Thymosins
