= CAP2 =

Protein-coding gene in the species Homo sapiens

Identifiers
- Aliases: CAP2, CAP, adenylate cyclase-associated protein, 2 (yeast), cyclase associated actin cytoskeleton regulatory protein 2
- External IDs: OMIM: 618385; MGI: 1914502; HomoloGene: 101397; GeneCards: CAP2; OMA:CAP2 - orthologs

Gene location (Human)
Chr.	Chromosome 6 (human)
Band	6p22.3	Start	17,393,595 bp
Band	6p22.3	End	17,557,780 bp

Gene location (Mouse)
Chr.	Chromosome 13 (mouse)
Band	13|13 A5	Start	46,655,324 bp
Band	13|13 A5	End	46,803,757 bp
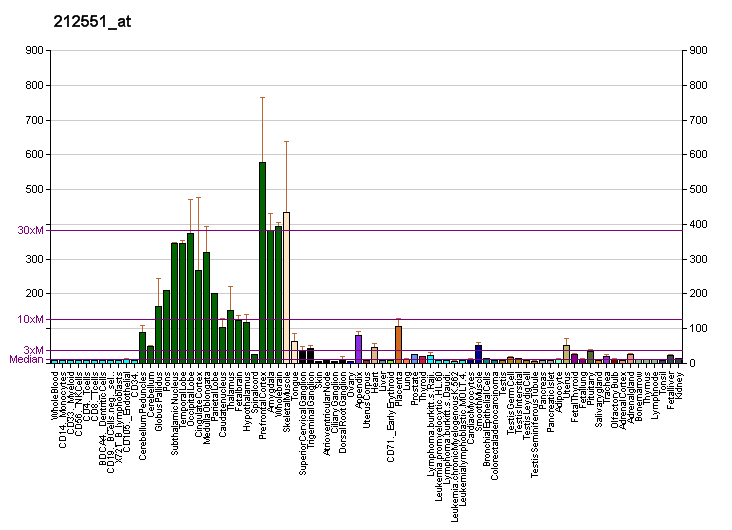

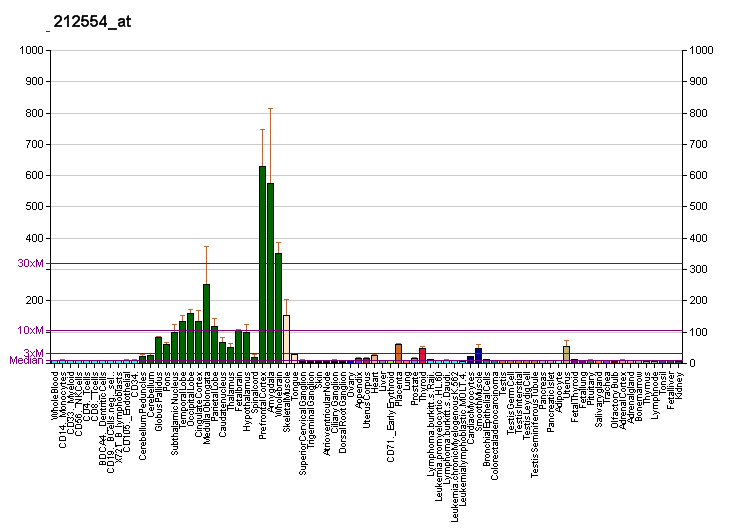
RNA expression pattern
Bgee	Human / Mouse (ortholog); Top expressed in: Skeletal muscle tissue of biceps brachii; Brodmann area 23; Skeletal muscle tissue of rectus abdominis; vastus lateralis muscle; endothelial cell; glutes; deltoid muscle; muscle of thigh; gastrocnemius muscle; frontal pole / Top expressed in: muscle of thigh; triceps brachii muscle; vastus lateralis muscle; temporal muscle; olfactory tubercle; primary motor cortex; dentate gyrus; Region I of hippocampus proper; gastrocnemius muscle; superior frontal gyrus; More reference expression data
BioGPS	More reference expression data
Gene ontology
Molecular function	protein binding; actin binding; adenylate cyclase binding; identical protein binding
Cellular component	plasma membrane; membrane; cortical actin cytoskeleton; postsynaptic density
Biological process	establishment or maintenance of cell polarity; cytoskeleton organization; signal transduction; activation of adenylate cyclase activity; actin polymerization or depolymerization; cell morphogenesis; regulation of adenylate cyclase activity
Sources:Amigo / QuickGO
Orthologs
Species	Human	Mouse
Entrez	10486	67252
Ensembl	ENSG00000112186	ENSMUSG00000021373
UniProt	P40123	Q9CYT6
RefSeq (mRNA)	NM_006366; NM_001363533; NM_001363534	NM_026056
RefSeq (protein)	NP_006357; NP_001350462; NP_001350463	NP_080332
Location (UCSC)	Chr 6: 17.39 – 17.56 Mb	Chr 13: 46.66 – 46.8 Mb
PubMed search
- Wikidata
View/Edit Human	View/Edit Mouse

Adenylyl cyclase-associated protein 2 is an enzyme that in humans is encoded by the CAP2 gene.

== Function ==
This gene was identified by its similarity to the gene for human adenylyl cyclase-associated protein. The function of the protein encoded by this gene is unknown. However, the protein appears to be able to interact with adenylyl cyclase-associated protein and actin.

== Interactions ==
CAP2 has been shown to interact with CAP1.
