= Thymosin =

Proteins present in many animal tissues

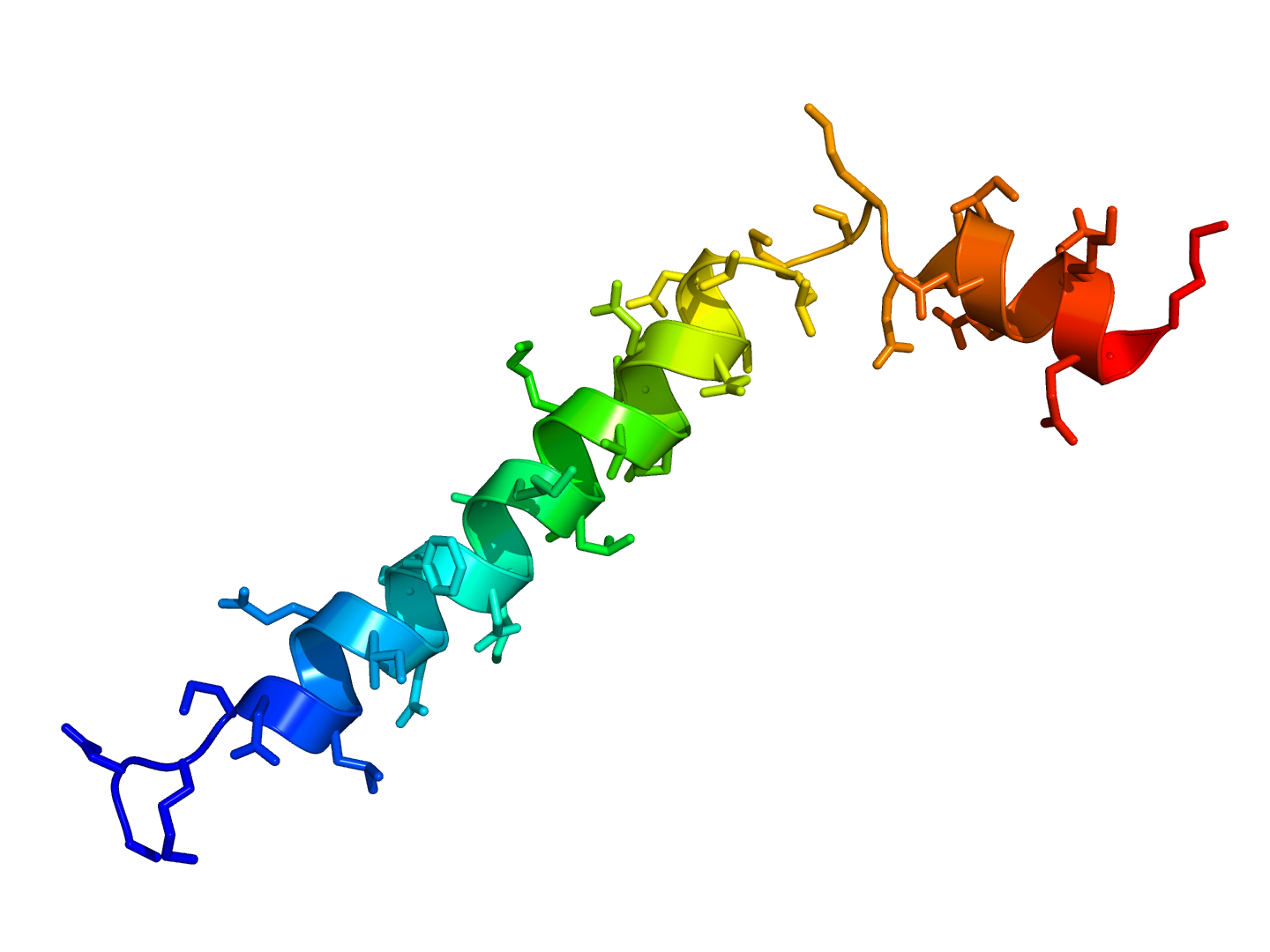
Structure of the bovine β9-thymosin polypeptide based on the PDB 1HJ0 coordinates.

Thymosins are small proteins present in many animal tissues. They are named thymosins because they were originally isolated from the thymus, but most are now known to be present in many other tissues. Thymosins have diverse biological activities, and two in particular, thymosins α_{1} and β_{4}, have potentially important uses in medicine, some of which have already progressed from the laboratory to the clinic. In relation to diseases, thymosins have been categorized as biological response modifiers. Thymosins are important for proper T-cell development and differentiation.

== Discovery ==
The discovery of thymosins in the mid 1960s emerged from investigations of the role of the thymus in development of the vertebrate immune system. Begun by Allan L. Goldstein in the Laboratory of Abraham White at the Albert Einstein College of Medicine in New York, the work continued at University of Texas Medical Branch in Galveston and at The George Washington University School of Medicine and Health Sciences in Washington D.C. The supposition that the role of the thymus might involve a hormone-like mechanism led to the isolation from thymus tissue of a biologically active preparation. Known as "Thymosin Fraction 5", this was able to restore some aspects of immune function in animals lacking thymus gland. Fraction 5 was found to contain over 40 small peptides (molecular weights ranging from 1000 to 15,000 Da.), which were named "thymosins" and classified as α, β and γ thymosins on the basis of their behaviour in an electric field. Although found together in Fraction 5, they are now known to be structurally and genetically unrelated. Thymosin β_{1} was found to be ubiquitin (truncated by two C-terminal glycine residues).

When individual thymosins were isolated from Fraction 5 and characterized, they were found to have extremely varied and important biological properties. However they are not truly thymic hormones in that they are not restricted in occurrence to thymus and several are widely distributed throughout many different tissues.

== Doping in sports ==
Thymosin beta-4 (and/or its derivative TB-500) was allegedly used by some players in various Australian football codes and is under investigation by the Australian Sports Anti-Doping Authority for anti-doping violations.

== Thymosin as a hair loss treatment ==
The process of hair growth utilizes many cellular and molecular mechanisms common to angiogenesis and wound healing. While studying the influence of thymosin beta-4 (Tβ4) on wound healing, Philp et al. accidentally found that hair grew more rapidly around the edges of wounds. In due course, they showed that Tβ4 induced rapid hair growth on the dorsal skin of healthy mice.

== See also ==
- Thymosin α1
- Beta thymosins
