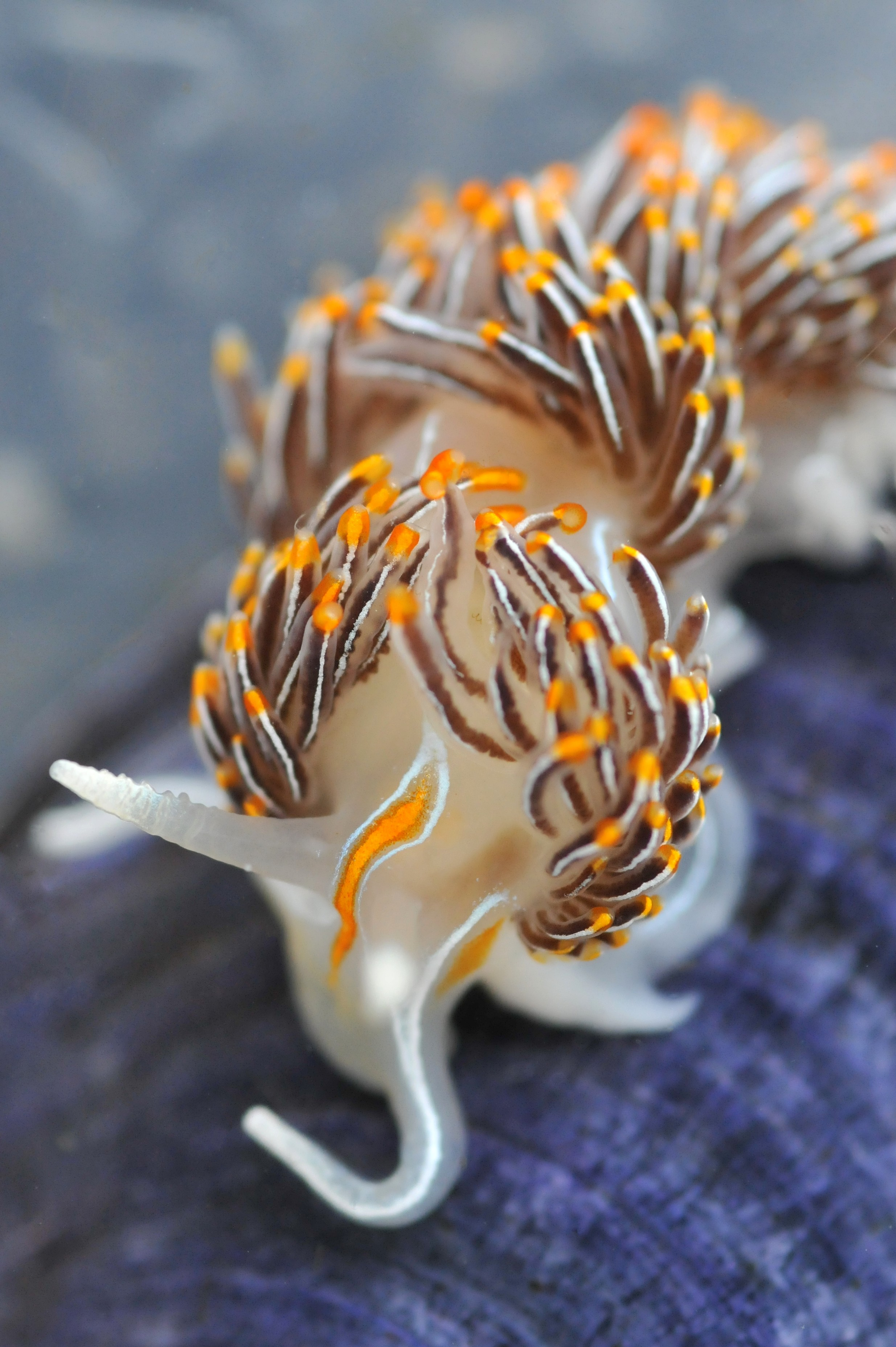

Scientific classification
- Kingdom: Animalia
- Phylum: Mollusca
- Class: Gastropoda
- Order: Nudibranchia
- Suborder: Aeolidacea
- Family: Myrrhinidae
- Genus: Hermissenda
- Species: H. crassicornis

Binomial name
- Hermissenda crassicornis Eschscholtz, 1831

= Hermissenda crassicornis =

Species of gastropod

Hermissenda crassicornis, also known as the opalescent nudibranch or thick-horned nudibranch, is a species of brightly coloured, sea slug or nudibranch, a marine gastropod mollusc in the family Facelinidae.

== Distribution ==
This nudibranch lives from Kodiak Island, Alaska, to Northern California. It is replaced by Hermissenda opalescens to the south of Northern California.

== Description ==
The species grows to be about 50 mm, or about 2 inches (5.08 cm). The colour of this nudibranch varies from one locality to another, but it is always easily recognizable by the orange stripe along its head area, as well as the white stripes on the cerata and those running down the mantle.

== Ecology ==
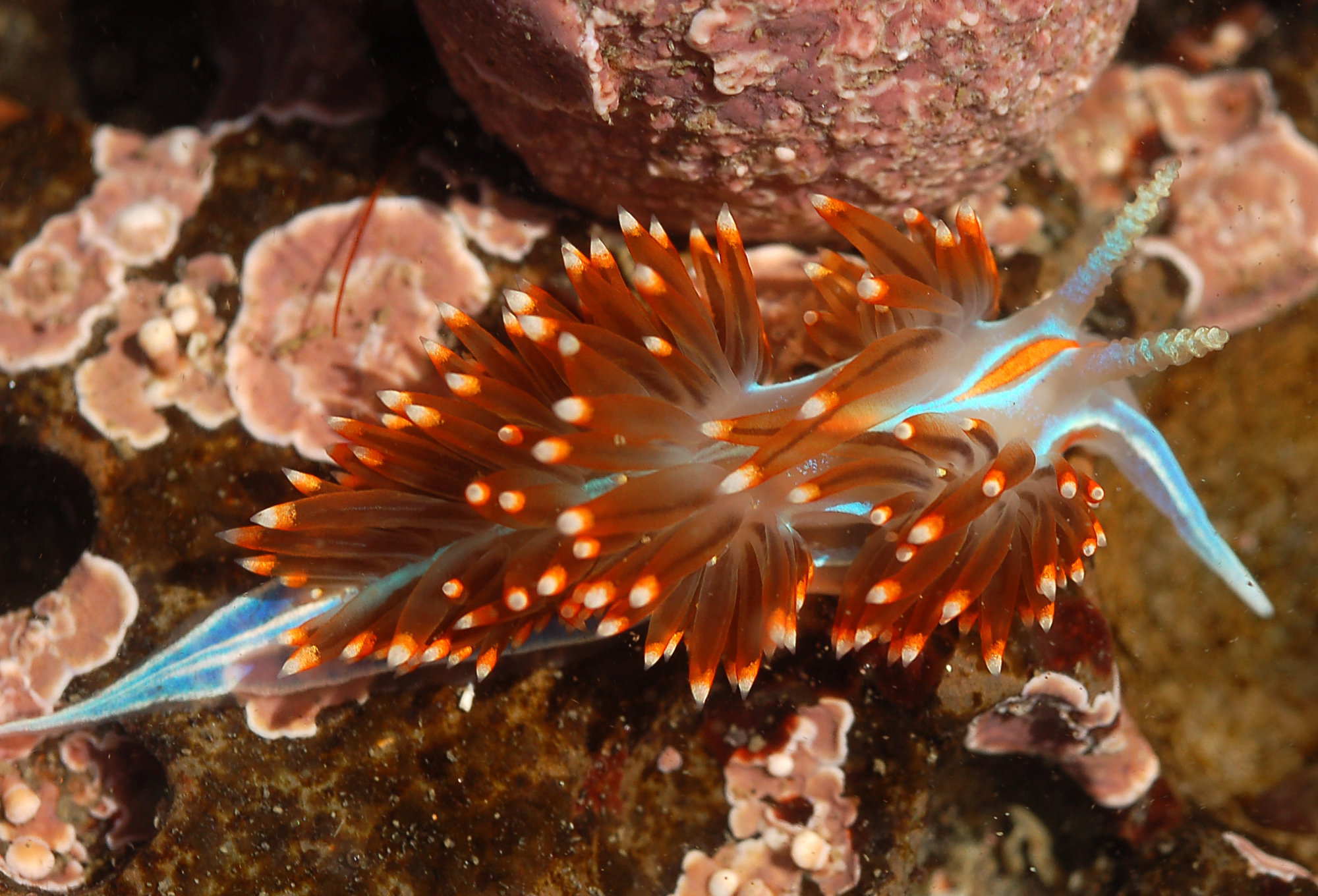
Opalescent nudibranch

=== Diet ===
This nudibranch prefers to feed on tunicates (such as the sessile ascidians), but overall has a diverse diet, also consuming hydroids, anthozoans, crustaceans, other nudibranchs, dead animals, and the polyps of jellyfish (theoretically, they may also consume stranded adult jellyfish too, if accessible). One study theorizes that H. crassicornis prefers tunicates and feeds only minimally on cnidarians (such as hydroids) either just to obtain defensive nematocysts in complement to their main diet, because cnidarians are simply too toxic to consume in large quantities, or simply because tunicates are nutritionally superior. It sometimes attacks other nudibranchs, and will even cannibalize smaller specimens of its own species.

=== Habitat ===
This species is found in various habitats, including the intertidal zone of rocky shores, but also in bays and estuaries.
