= Thymosin α1 =

Protein-coding gene in the species Homo sapiens

PTMA
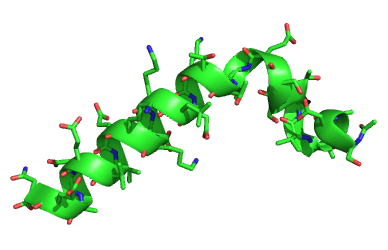
Available structures
PDB	Ortholog search: PDBe RCSB
PDB	List of PDB id codes 2L9I, 2MNQ

Identifiers
- Aliases: PTMA, prothymosin, alpha, TMSA, prothymosin alpha
- External IDs: OMIM: 188390; MGI: 97803; HomoloGene: 136511; GeneCards: PTMA; OMA:PTMA - orthologs

Gene location (Human)
Chr.	Chromosome 2 (human)
Band	2q37.1	Start	231,706,895 bp
Band	2q37.1	End	231,713,551 bp

Gene location (Mouse)
Chr.	Chromosome 1 (mouse)
Band	1|1 C5	Start	86,526,726 bp
Band	1|1 C5	End	86,530,712 bp
RNA expression pattern
Bgee	Human / Mouse (ortholog); Top expressed in: Achilles tendon; monocyte; corpus callosum; ganglionic eminence; endometrium; tibial arteries; C1 segment; thyroid gland; left lobe of thyroid gland; canal of the cervix / Top expressed in: epiblast; blastocyst; ventricular zone; ganglionic eminence; tail of embryo; thymus; ovary; genital tubercle; embryo; morula; More reference expression data
BioGPS	n/a
Gene ontology
Molecular function	protein binding; histone binding
Cellular component	nucleoplasm; cytosol; nucleus
Biological process	transcription, DNA-templated; histone exchange; negative regulation of apoptotic process
Sources:Amigo / QuickGO
Orthologs
Species	Human	Mouse
Entrez	5757	19231
Ensembl	ENSG00000187514	ENSMUSG00000026238
UniProt	P06454	P26350
RefSeq (mRNA)	NM_001099285; NM_002823	NM_008972
RefSeq (protein)	NP_001092755; NP_002814	NP_032998; NP_001347759; NP_001347760
Location (UCSC)	Chr 2: 231.71 – 231.71 Mb	Chr 1: 86.53 – 86.53 Mb
PubMed search
- Wikidata
View/Edit Human	View/Edit Mouse

Thymosin α1
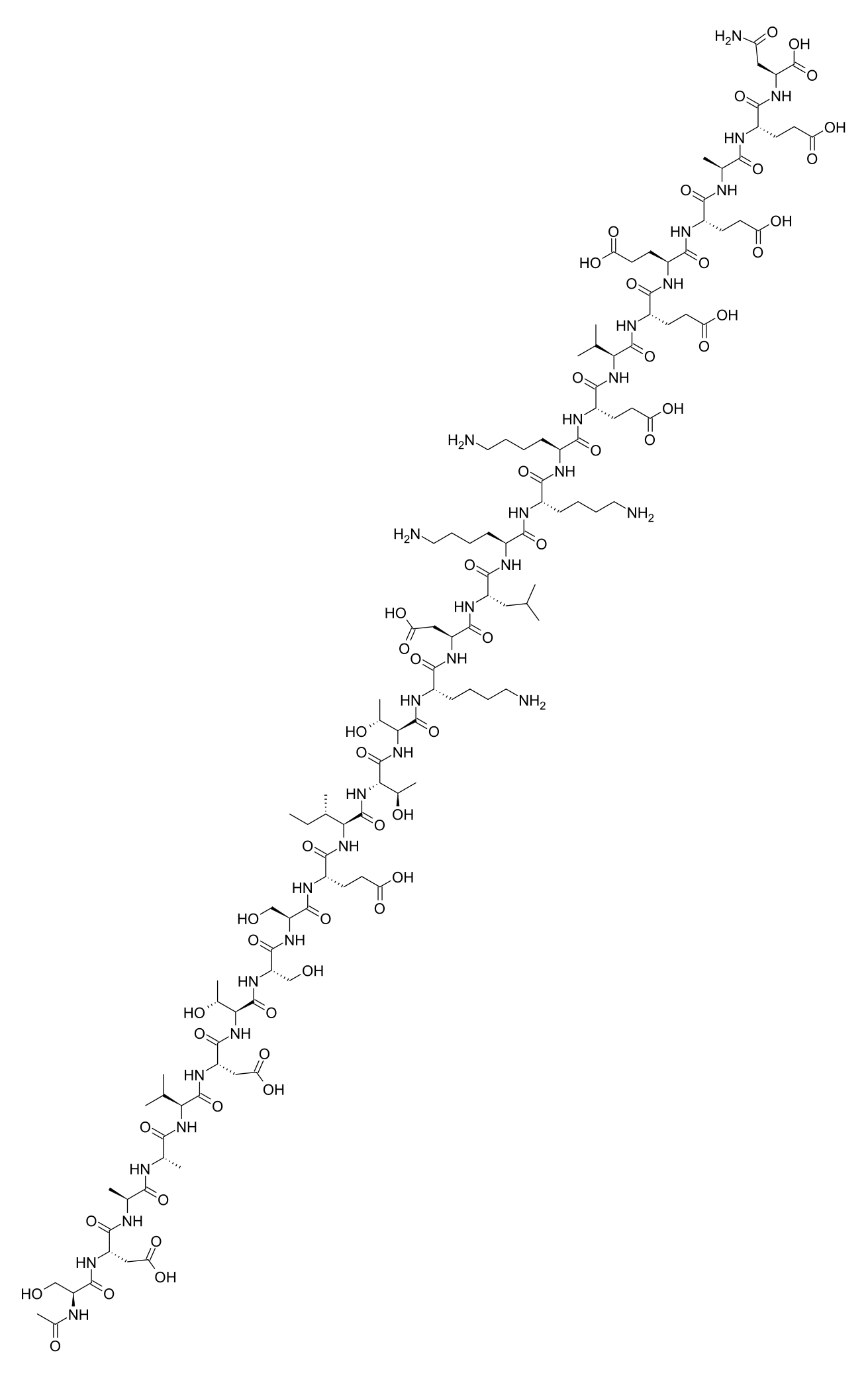

Identifiers
- IUPAC name: (4S)-4-[[(2S)-2-[[(2S)-2-[[(2S)-2-[[(2S)-2-[[(2S)-2-[[(2S)-2-[[(2S)-2-[[(2S)-2-[[(2S)-2-[[(2S)-2-[[(2S)-2-[[(2S)-2-[[(2S)-2-[[(2S,3R)-2-[[(2S,3R)-2-[[(2S,3S)-2-[[(2S)-2-[[(2S)-2-[[(2S)-2-[[(2S,3R)-2-[[(2S)-2-[[(2S)-2-[[(2S)-2-[[(2S)-2-[[(2S)-2-[[(2S)-2-acetamido-3-hydroxypropanoyl]amino]-3-carboxypropanoyl]amino]propanoyl]amino]propanoyl]amino]-3-methylbutanoyl]amino]-3-carboxypropanoyl]amino]-3-hydroxybutanoyl]amino]-3-hydroxypropanoyl]amino]-3-hydroxypropanoyl]amino]-4-carboxybutanoyl]amino]-3-methylpentanoyl]amino]-3-hydroxybutanoyl]amino]-3-hydroxybutanoyl]amino]-6-aminohexanoyl]amino]-3-carboxypropanoyl]amino]-4-methylpentanoyl]amino]-6-aminohexanoyl]amino]-4-carboxybutanoyl]amino]-6-aminohexanoyl]amino]-6-aminohexanoyl]amino]-4-carboxybutanoyl]amino]-3-methylbutanoyl]amino]-3-methylbutanoyl]amino]-4-carboxybutanoyl]amino]-4-carboxybutanoyl]amino]propanoyl]amino]-5-[[(1S)-3-amino-1-carboxy-3-oxopropyl]amino]-5-oxopentanoic acid
- CAS Number: 62304-98-7
- PubChem CID: 16130571

Chemical and physical data
- Formula: C_{129}H_{215}N_{33}O_{55}
- Molar mass: 3108.315 g·mol^{−1}
- 3D model (JSmol): Interactive image
- SMILES: CC[C@H](C)[C@@H](C(=O)N[C@@H]([C@@H](C)O)C(=O)N[C@@H]([C@@H](C)O)C(=O)N[C@@H](CCCCN)C(=O)N[C@@H](CC(=O)O)C(=O)N[C@@H](CC(C)C)C(=O)N[C@@H](CCCCN)C(=O)N[C@@H](CCC(=O)O)C(=O)N[C@@H](CCCCN)C(=O)N[C@@H](CCCCN)C(=O)N[C@@H](CCC(=O)O)C(=O)N[C@@H](C(C)C)C(=O)N[C@@H](C(C)C)C(=O)N[C@@H](CCC(=O)O)C(=O)N[C@@H](CCC(=O)O)C(=O)N[C@@H](C)C(=O)N[C@@H](CCC(=O)O)C(=O)N[C@@H](CC(=O)N)C(=O)O)NC(=O)[C@H](CCC(=O)O)NC(=O)[C@H](CO)NC(=O)[C@H](CO)NC(=O)[C@H]([C@@H](C)O)NC(=O)[C@H](CC(=O)O)NC(=O)[C@H](C(C)C)NC(=O)[C@H](C)NC(=O)[C@H](C)NC(=O)[C@H](CC(=O)O)NC(=O)[C@H](CO)NC(=O)C
- InChI: InChI=1S/C129H215N33O55/c1-18-59(10)98(159-114(201)76(36-42-91(181)182)146-120(207)83(53-164)154-121(208)84(54-165)155-127(214)99(63(14)166)160-118(205)80(51-94(187)188)152-123(210)95(56(4)5)156-104(191)62(13)135-102(189)60(11)137-115(202)78(49-92(183)184)151-119(206)82(52-163)138-66(17)169)125(212)161-101(65(16)168)128(215)162-100(64(15)167)126(213)147-70(30-22-26-46-133)109(196)150-79(50-93(185)186)117(204)149-77(47-55(2)3)116(203)142-69(29-21-25-45-132)108(195)144-73(33-39-88(175)176)110(197)141-67(27-19-23-43-130)106(193)140-68(28-20-24-44-131)107(194)145-75(35-41-90(179)180)113(200)157-97(58(8)9)124(211)158-96(57(6)7)122(209)148-74(34-40-89(177)178)111(198)143-71(31-37-86(171)172)105(192)136-61(12)103(190)139-72(32-38-87(173)174)112(199)153-81(129(216)217)48-85(134)170/h55-65,67-84,95-101,163-168H,18-54,130-133H2,1-17H3,(H2,134,170)(H,135,189)(H,136,192)(H,137,202)(H,138,169)(H,139,190)(H,140,193)(H,141,197)(H,142,203)(H,143,198)(H,144,195)(H,145,194)(H,146,207)(H,147,213)(H,148,209)(H,149,204)(H,150,196)(H,151,206)(H,152,210)(H,153,199)(H,154,208)(H,155,214)(H,156,191)(H,157,200)(H,158,211)(H,159,201)(H,160,205)(H,161,212)(H,162,215)(H,171,172)(H,173,174)(H,175,176)(H,177,178)(H,179,180)(H,181,182)(H,183,184)(H,185,186)(H,187,188)(H,216,217)/t59-,60-,61-,62-,63+,64+,65+,67-,68-,69-,70-,71-,72-,73-,74-,75-,76-,77-,78-,79-,80-,81-,82-,83-,84-,95-,96-,97-,98-,99-,100-,101-/m0/s1; Key:NZVYCXVTEHPMHE-ZSUJOUNUSA-N

Thymosin α_{1} is a peptide fragment derived from prothymosin alpha, a protein that in humans is encoded by the PTMA gene.

It was the first of the peptides from Thymosin Fraction 5 to be completely sequenced and synthesized. Unlike β thymosins, to which it is genetically and chemically unrelated, thymosin α_{1} is produced as a 28-amino acid fragment having the sequence Ac-SDAAVDTSSEITTKDLKEKKEVEEEAEN, which is made from cleavage of a longer, 113-amino acid precursor, prothymosin α.

== Function ==
Thymosin α_{1} is an agonist for toll-like receptor 2 and toll-like receptor 9 on both myeloid and dendritic antigen-presenting cells, thereby stimulating the adaptive immune response.

Thymosin α_{1} is believed to be a major component of Thymosin Fraction 5 responsible for the activity of that preparation in restoring immune function in animals lacking thymus glands. It has been found to enhance cell-mediated immunity in humans as well as experimental animals.

== Therapeutic application ==
Thymosin α_{1} is approved in some countries for the treatment of Hepatitis B and C, and it is also used to boost the immune response in the treatment of other diseases. The synthetic version of Thymosin α_{1} is known as Thymalfasin and is sold under the brand name Zadaxin.

Thymosin α_{1} is usually administered by subcutaneous injection.

=== Clinical studies ===
Clinical trials suggest thymosin α_{1} may be useful in cystic fibrosis, septic shock, acute respiratory distress syndrome, peritonitis, pancreatitis, acute cytomegalovirus infection, TB, severe acute respiratory syndrome, and lung infections in critically ill patients., and for chronic hepatitis B.

For hospitalized COVID-19 patients, a 2023 review concluded thymosin α_{1} was not effective in reducing mortality or length of hospitalization. A subsequent 2023 review contradicted this, showing a reduction in mortality but not length of stay.

It has been studied for possible use in treating cancer (e.g. with chemotherapy).

== See also ==
- Humanin
- MOTS-c
- Thymosins
- TB-500
