= GSK-4336A =

Chemical compound

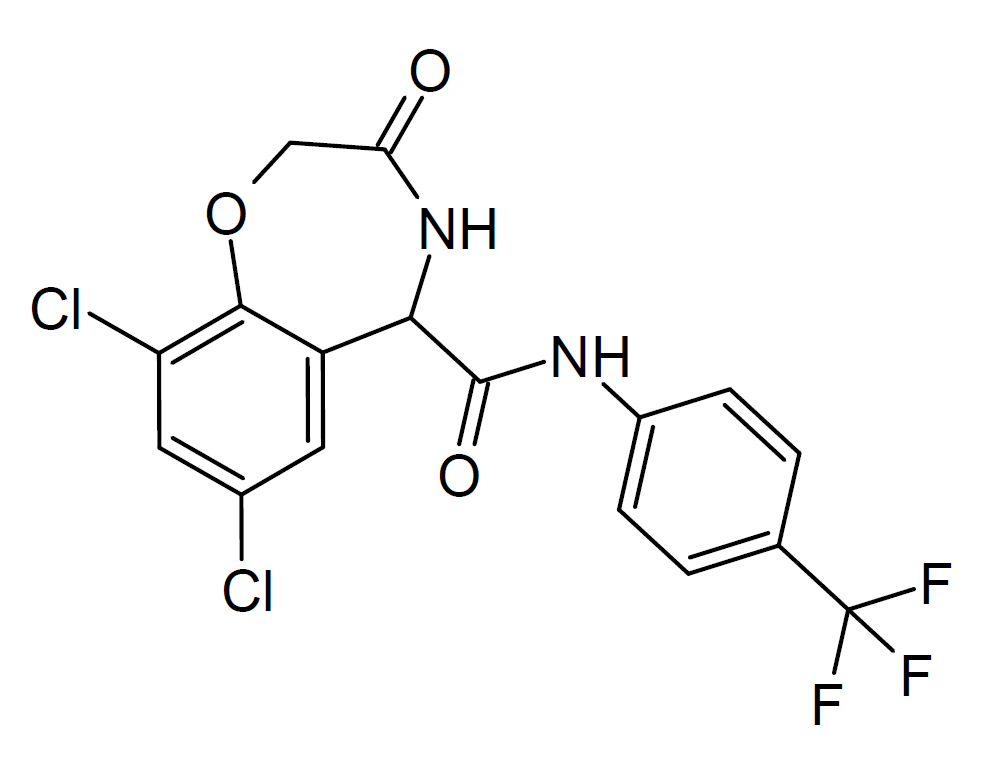

Legal status
- Legal status: US: Investigational new drug

Identifiers
- IUPAC name: 7,9-dichloro-3-oxo-N-[4-(trifluoromethyl)phenyl]-4,5-dihydro-1,4-benzoxazepine-5-carboxamide
- CAS Number: 1067226-47-4
- PubChem CID: 71054853
- ChemSpider: 129265394
- ChEMBL: ChEMBL5203846

Chemical and physical data
- Formula: C_{17}H_{11}Cl_{2}F_{3}N_{2}O_{3}
- Molar mass: 419.18 g·mol^{−1}
- 3D model (JSmol): Interactive image
- SMILES: C1C(=O)NC(C2=C(O1)C(=CC(=C2)Cl)Cl)C(=O)NC3=CC=C(C=C3)C(F)(F)F
- InChI: InChI=1S/C17H11Cl2F3N2O3/c18-9-5-11-14(24-13(25)7-27-15(11)12(19)6-9)16(26)23-10-3-1-8(2-4-10)17(20,21)22/h1-6,14H,7H2,(H,23,26)(H,24,25); Key:USVVDHAIRZSKRE-UHFFFAOYSA-N

GSK4336A is a drug which acts as a selective androgen receptor modulator (SARM), and was developed for androgen replacement therapy.

== See also ==
- AC-262536
- ACP-105
- Enobosarm
- JNJ-28330835
- Ligandrol
