= PF-06260414 =

Chemical compound

Legal status
- Legal status: US: Investigational new drug

Identifiers
- IUPAC name: 6-[(4R)-4-methyl-1,1-dioxo-1,2,6-thiadiazinan-2-yl]isoquinoline-1-carbonitrile
- CAS Number: 1612755-71-1
- PubChem CID: 76071881
- DrugBank: DB15221
- ChemSpider: 58824307
- UNII: 3I487UHH95
- ChEMBL: ChEMBL4297476

Chemical and physical data
- Formula: C_{14}H_{14}N_{4}O_{2}S
- Molar mass: 302.35 g·mol^{−1}
- 3D model (JSmol): Interactive image
- SMILES: C[C@@H]1CNS(=O)(=O)N(C1)C2=CC3=C(C=C2)C(=NC=C3)C#N
- InChI: InChI=1S/C14H14N4O2S/c1-10-8-17-21(19,20)18(9-10)12-2-3-13-11(6-12)4-5-16-14(13)7-15/h2-6,10,17H,8-9H2,1H3/t10-/m1/s1; Key:ZKAVFOXYJCREBQ-SNVBAGLBSA-N

PF-06260414 is a drug which acts as a selective androgen receptor modulator (SARM), and was developed for androgen replacement therapy.

== See also ==
- AC-262536
- ACP-105
- Enobosarm
- JNJ-28330835
- Ligandrol
