= JNJ-26146900 =

Abandoned prostate cancer drug

Clinical data
- Other names: JNJ26146900
- Drug class: Selective androgen receptor modulator

Identifiers
- IUPAC name: 2-[(2R)-1-ethylsulfonyl-2-hydroxypropan-2-yl]-6-(trifluoromethyl)-1H-indole-5-carbonitrile
- CAS Number: 868691-50-3
- PubChem CID: 11602942
- ChemSpider: 9777698
- UNII: 3397AFW49K
- ChEMBL: ChEMBL395886

Chemical and physical data
- Formula: C_{15}H_{15}F_{3}N_{2}O_{3}S
- Molar mass: 360.35 g·mol^{−1}
- 3D model (JSmol): Interactive image
- SMILES: CCS(=O)(=O)C[C@@](C)(C1=CC2=CC(=C(C=C2N1)C(F)(F)F)C#N)O
- InChI: InChI=1S/C15H15F3N2O3S/c1-3-24(22,23)8-14(2,21)13-5-9-4-10(7-19)11(15(16,17)18)6-12(9)20-13/h4-6,20-21H,3,8H2,1-2H3/t14-/m0/s1; Key:UJGGNFGSHPHGNE-AWEZNQCLSA-N

JNJ-26146900 is a selective androgen receptor modulator (SARM) which was developed by Johnson & Johnson for the potential treatment of prostate cancer but was never marketed.

== Description ==
The drug is a nonsteroidal androgen receptor (AR) modulator with mixed agonistic (androgenic) and antagonistic (antiandrogenic) effects. In animals, it partially prevents castration-induced loss of body weight, lean body mass (LBM), and bone (osteopenia or osteoporosis) and reduces prostate weight and prostate tumor growth. The nonsteroidal antiandrogen bicalutamide was also effective in partially preventing castration-induced loss of body weight and lean body mass, suggesting that it too may have some SARM-like activity in certain tissues. However, neither JNJ-26146900 nor bicalutamide were as effective as dihydrotestosterone (DHT) in terms of these effects. Based on the preceding findings, JNJ-26146900 shows a profile of androgenic and anabolic effects in muscle and bone but antiandrogenic effects in the prostate. The drug is a novel indole derivative SARM and is structurally related to JNJ-37654032.

JNJ-26146900 did not advance past the preclinical research and was never tested in humans. It was first described in the scientific literature by 2007.

== See also ==
- JNJ-28330835
