= OPK-88004 =

Chemical compound

Legal status
- Legal status: US: Investigational new drug

Identifiers
- IUPAC name: propan-2-yl N-[(2S)-7-cyano-4-(pyridin-2-ylmethyl)-2,3-dihydro-1H-cyclopenta[b]indol-2-yl]carbamate
- CAS Number: 1029692-15-6
- PubChem CID: 24963749
- UNII: XKW9MYF94Y
- CompTox Dashboard (EPA): DTXSID50145591

Chemical and physical data
- Formula: C_{22}H_{22}N_{4}O_{2}
- Molar mass: 374.444 g·mol^{−1}
- 3D model (JSmol): Interactive image
- SMILES: CC(C)OC(=O)N[C@H]1CC2=C(C1)N(C3=C2C=C(C=C3)C#N)CC4=CC=CC=N4
- InChI: InChI=1S/C22H22N4O2/c1-14(2)28-22(27)25-17-10-19-18-9-15(12-23)6-7-20(18)26(21(19)11-17)13-16-5-3-4-8-24-16/h3-9,14,17H,10-11,13H2,1-2H3,(H,25,27)/t17-/m0/s1; Key:IHIWYQYVBNODSV-KRWDZBQOSA-N

OPK-88004 (formerly known as LY-2452473 or TT-701) is a non-steroidal indole derivative which acts as a selective androgen receptor modulator (SARM). It has been investigated by OPKO Health for the treatment of erectile dysfunction and symptoms associated with benign prostate hyperplasia.

== Research ==
The compound advanced to a phase II trial in benign prostatic hyperplasia, but it was terminated due to difficulty in measuring prostate size, the trial's primary endpoint.

It was also tried in a study to improve quality of life in patients with prostate cancer. Although it did not cause progression of the disease and increased lean body mass, the drug did not improve sexual function.

== See also ==
- List of investigational sexual dysfunction drugs
- Enobosarm
- JNJ-28330835
- Ligandrol
