= Vosilasarm =

Chemical compound

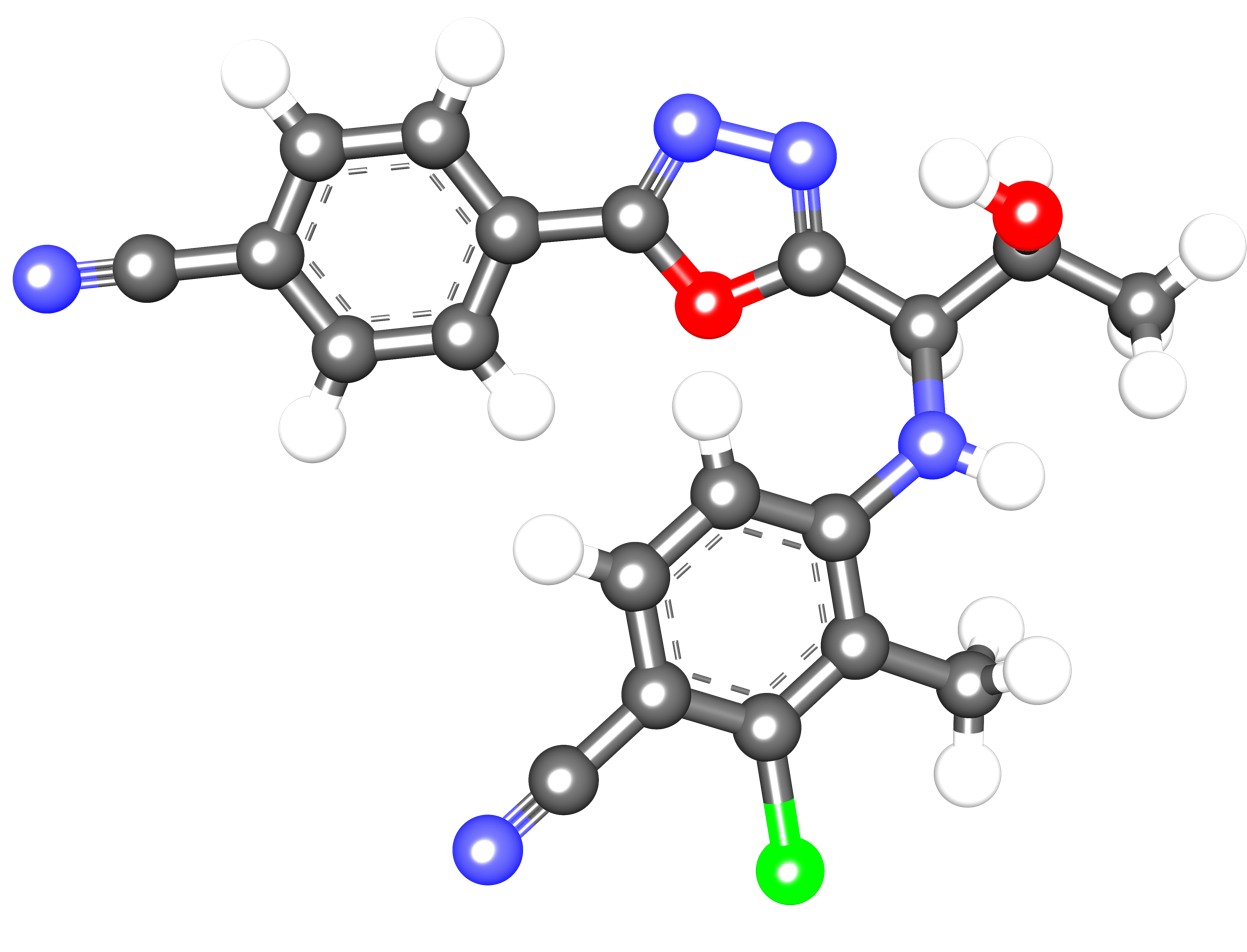

Clinical data
- Other names: RAD140; RAD-140; EP0062; Testolone; Testalone
- Routes of administration: By mouth

Pharmacokinetic data
- Elimination half-life: 45–60 hours

Identifiers
- IUPAC name: 2-Chloro-4-{[(1R,2S)-1-[5-(4-cyanophenyl)-1,3,4-oxadiazol-2-yl]-2-hydroxypropyl]amino}-3-methylbenzonitrile
- CAS Number: 1182367-47-0
- PubChem CID: 44200882
- DrugBank: DB13939
- ChemSpider: 26387625
- UNII: 4O87Q44KNC
- KEGG: D13046
- ChEMBL: ChEMBL1672635
- CompTox Dashboard (EPA): DTXSID201032907

Chemical and physical data
- Formula: C_{20}H_{16}ClN_{5}O_{2}
- Molar mass: 393.83 g·mol^{−1}
- 3D model (JSmol): Interactive image
- SMILES: ClC1=C(C#N)C=CC(=C1C)N[C@H]([C@H](C)O)C2=NN=C(O2)C3=CC=C(C=C3)C#N
- InChI: InChI=1S/C20H16ClN5O2/c1-11-16(8-7-15(10-23)17(11)21)24-18(12(2)27)20-26-25-19(28-20)14-5-3-13(9-22)4-6-14/h3-8,12,18,24,27H,1-2H3/t12-,18+/m0/s1; Key:XMBUPPIEVAFYHO-KPZWWZAWSA-N

Vosilasarm, also known by the development codes RAD140 and EP0062 and by the black-market name Testolone or Testalone, is a selective androgen receptor modulator (SARM) which is under development for the treatment of hormone-sensitive breast cancer. It is specifically under development for the treatment of androgen receptor-positive, estrogen receptor-negative, HER2-negative advanced breast cancer. Vosilasarm was also previously under development for the treatment of sarcopenia (age-related muscle atrophy), osteoporosis, and weight loss due to cancer cachexia, but development for these indications was discontinued. The drug is taken by mouth.

Side effects of vosilasarm may include vomiting, dehydration, constipation, decreased appetite, weight loss, changes in sex hormone levels, elevated liver enzymes, and liver toxicity. Vosilasarm is a nonsteroidal SARM, acting as an agonist of the androgen receptor (AR), the biological target of androgens and anabolic steroids like testosterone and dihydrotestosterone (DHT). However, it shows dissociation of effect between tissues in preclinical studies, with agonistic and anabolic effects in muscle, agonistic effects in breast, and partially agonistic or antagonistic effects in the prostate gland and seminal vesicles.

Vosilasarm was developed in 2010 and was first described in the literature in 2011. It was originally developed by Radius Health and is now under development by Ellipses Pharma. The first clinical study of vosilasarm, a small (n=22) phase 1 study in women with metastatic breast cancer, was started in 2017 and completed in 2020, with results published in 2019, 2020, and 2022. As of March 2023, vosilasarm is in phase 1/2 clinical trials for the treatment of breast cancer.

Aside from its development as a potential pharmaceutical drug, vosilasarm is on the World Anti-Doping Agency list of prohibited substances and is sold for physique- and performance-enhancing purposes by black-market Internet suppliers. Vosilasarm is often used in these contexts at doses that have not been evaluated in clinical trials, with unknown effectiveness and safety. Many products sold online that are purported to be a specific SARM either contain none or contain other unrelated substances. Social media has played an important role in facilitating the widespread non-medical use of SARMs.

== Medical uses ==
Vosilasarm is not approved for any medical use and is not available as a licensed pharmaceutical drug as of 2023.

== Side effects ==
Side effects of vosilasarm in preliminary clinical studies in women with metastatic breast cancer have included vomiting (27%), dehydration (27%), constipation, decreased appetite and weight loss (27%), hypophosphatemia, decreased sex hormone-binding globulin (SHBG) levels (100%), increased prostate-specific antigen (PSA) levels (80%), and abnormal liver function tests, including elevated aspartate aminotransferase (59%), elevated alanine aminotransferase (46%), and elevated total blood bilirubin (27%).

In gonadally intact male cynomolgus monkeys, vosilasarm suppressed testosterone levels by around 50% (from ~600–800 ng/dL to ~200–300 ng/dL) across three dose levels (0.01 mg/kg, 0.1 mg/kg, and 1.0 mg/kg). Changes in serum lipids, including of triglycerides, LDL cholesterol, and HDL cholesterol were also observed. Elevated liver enzymes were minimally observed in monkeys.

A number of case reports of liver toxicity with non-medical use of vosilasarm have been published. A case report of acute myocarditis with non-medical use of vosilasarm also exists.

== Overdose ==
Vosilasarm has been assessed in clinical trials in women with breast cancer at doses ranging from 50 to 150 mg/day, with the maximum safe and tolerated dose being 100 mg/day. The drug sold via black-market Internet suppliers and used non-medically has been reported to be taken at doses of 5 to 30 mg/day, with unknown adverse effects and risks.

== Pharmacology ==
=== Pharmacodynamics ===
Vosilasarm is selective androgen receptor modulator (SARM), or a tissue-selective mixed agonist or partial agonist of the androgen receptor (AR). This receptor is the biological target of endogenous androgens like testosterone and dihydrotestosterone (DHT) and of synthetic anabolic steroids like nandrolone and oxandrolone. Vosilasarm shows high affinity for the AR, with a K_{i} value of 7 nM (relative to 29 nM for testosterone and 10 nM for DHT). It shows good selectivity for the AR over other steroid hormone receptors, with the closest off-target receptor being the progesterone receptor (IC_{50} = 750 nM versus 0.2 nM for progesterone). Vosilasarm also shows potent efficacy in terms of AR activation, with an EC_{50} value of 0.1 nM in the C2C12 osteoblast differentiation assay. The AR is widely expressed in tissues throughout the body, including in the prostate gland, seminal vesicles, genitals, gonads, skin, hair follicles, muscle, bone, heart, adrenal cortex, liver, kidneys, and brain, among others. Vosilasarm has been found to have varying full agonist and partial agonist AR-mediated effects in different tissues, including potent agonistic and anabolic activity in muscle and bone, potent agonistic effects in AR-expressing human breast cancer cell lines, and partial agonist or antagonist activity in the prostate gland and seminal vesicles.

In castrated immature male rats, vosilasarm (at 10 mg/kg/day orally, the highest assessed dose) maximally stimulated prostate weight to 67%, seminal vesicle weight to 59%, and levator ani muscle weight to 117% compared to that induced with testosterone propionate 1 mg/kg/day. Moreover, when combined with testosterone propionate, vosilasarm partially antagonized the weight increases of the prostate gland and seminal vesicles, reducing them to 84% and 78% (both from 100%), respectively. Conversely however, the combination of testosterone propionate and vosilasarm was additive in terms of levator ani muscle weight stimulation, increasing it to 124%. Vosilasarm was found to stimulate muscle at a dose much lower than that required to stimulate the prostate. A dose of 0.3 mg/kg/day stimulated levator ani muscle weight to a similar extent relative to the levator ani weight in non-castrated controls. Conversely, a 33-fold higher dose of 10 mg/kg/day was required to stimulate prostate weight to a similar extent as that in non-castrated controls. Similarly, in gonadally intact immature rats, 0.3 mg/kg/day vosilasarm stimulated levator ani muscle weight to a similar extent as testosterone propionate 0.5 mg/kg/day, but a dose of 30 mg/kg/day (100-fold higher) was required to stimulate the prostate to a similar extent as testosterone propionate 0.5 mg/kg/day. Hence, in rats, vosilasarm is a potent full agonist of the levator ani muscle but a partial agonist and antagonist of the prostate and seminal vesicles, and is strongly selective for stimulating the levator ani muscle over the prostate gland. In young male cynomolgus monkeys, vosilasarm, at oral doses of 0.01 mg/kg/day, 0.1 mg/kg/day, and 1 mg/kg/day for 28 days, dose-dependently stimulated body weight (+10% at ≥0.1 mg/kg/day) and numerically increased lean body mass. The lack of statistical significance was likely due to the small sample sizes per dosing group (n=3 each). No data on vosilasarm and lean body mass in humans have been published as of 2022.

=== Pharmacokinetics ===
Vosilasarm shows good oral bioavailability in rats (27–63%) and monkeys (65–75%) and is orally active in humans. The elimination half-life of vosilasarm is 45 to 60 hours.

== Chemistry ==
Vosilasarm is an oxadiazole aniline derivative. Other aniline SARMs include AC-262536 and ACP-105.

== History ==
Vosilasarm was developed by Radius Health in 2010. It was first described in the literature in 2011 in a paper detailing its design, synthesis, and preclinical characterization in vitro and in rats and monkeys. It was stated in this paper that phase 1 clinical studies of vosilasarm for treatment of severe weight loss due to cancer cachexia were being prepared. However, these studies were never completed or published and development for this indication was discontinued. Subsequently, vosilasarm was repurposed for the treatment of breast cancer.

== Society and culture ==
=== Names ===
Vosilasarm is the generic name of the drug and its International Nonproprietary Name (INN). It is also known by its pharmaceutical developmental code names RAD140 (Radius Health) and EP0062 (Ellipses Pharma). Additionally, vosilasarm is known by the black-market name Testolone or Testalone.

=== Non-medical use ===
Vosilasarm and other SARMs are sold on the black market on the Internet. Aside from vosilasarm, the other most commonly used SARMs include enobosarm (ostarine; GTx-024, S-22), LGD-4033 (VK5211; "ligandrol"), and andarine (GTx-007; S-4). Social media has played an important role in facilitating the widespread non-medical use of SARMs.

== Research ==
The first-in-human study, a phase 1 trial, was initiated in October 2017 and completed in September 2020 in postmenopausal women with breast cancer. The study investigated oral doses of vosilasarm of 50 mg/day to 150 mg/day, with the maximum tolerated dose found to be 100 mg/day. A phase 1/2 study proposal of vosilasarm for treatment of breast cancer was published in 2023. It will recruit up to 128 patients.
