= GLPG-0492 =

Medication

Legal status
- Legal status: US: Investigational new drug

Identifiers
- IUPAC name: 4-[(4R)-4-(hydroxymethyl)-3-methyl-2,5-dioxo-4-phenylimidazolidin-1-yl]-2-(trifluoromethyl)benzonitrile
- CAS Number: 1215085-93-0
- PubChem CID: 59317173
- ChemSpider: 28669946
- ChEMBL: ChEMBL2178101

Chemical and physical data
- Formula: C_{19}H_{14}F_{3}N_{3}O_{3}
- Molar mass: 389.334 g·mol^{−1}
- 3D model (JSmol): Interactive image
- SMILES: CN1C(=O)N(C(=O)[C@]1(CO)C2=CC=CC=C2)C3=CC(=C(C=C3)C#N)C(F)(F)F
- InChI: InChI=1S/C19H14F3N3O3/c1-24-17(28)25(14-8-7-12(10-23)15(9-14)19(20,21)22)16(27)18(24,11-26)13-5-3-2-4-6-13/h2-9,26H,11H2,1H3/t18-/m0/s1; Key:VAJGULUVTFDTAS-SFHVURJKSA-N

GLPG-0492 (DT-200) is a drug which acts as a selective androgen receptor modulator (SARM). It has been investigated for the treatment of cachexia and muscular dystrophy.

== See also ==
- ACP-105
- Enobosarm
- JNJ-28330835
- Ligandrol
