= C19H18F3N3O6 =

The molecular formula C_{19}H_{18}F_{3}N_{3}O_{6} (molar mass : 441.363 g/mol) may refer to:

- Acetoxolutamide
- Andarine
