= Acetoxolutamide =

Chemical compound

Clinical data
- Drug class: Nonsteroidal androgen; Selective androgen receptor modulator

Identifiers
- IUPAC name: (2R)-3-(4-acetamidophenoxy)-2-hydroxy-2-methyl-N-[4-nitro-3-(trifluoromethyl)phenyl]propanamide
- CAS Number: 885324-25-4
- PubChem CID: 10181786
- ChemSpider: 8357288
- ChEMBL: ChEMBL511130
- CompTox Dashboard (EPA): DTXSID10436497

Chemical and physical data
- Formula: C_{19}H_{18}F_{3}N_{3}O_{6}
- Molar mass: 441.363 g·mol^{−1}
- 3D model (JSmol): Interactive image
- SMILES: CC(=O)NC1=CC=C(C=C1)OC[C@](C)(C(=O)NC2=CC(=C(C=C2)[N+](=O)[O-])C(F)(F)F)O
- InChI: InChI=1S/C19H18F3N3O6/c1-11(26)23-12-3-6-14(7-4-12)31-10-18(2,28)17(27)24-13-5-8-16(25(29)30)15(9-13)19(20,21)22/h3-9,28H,10H2,1-2H3,(H,23,26)(H,24,27)/t18-/m1/s1; Key:YVXVTLGIDOACBJ-GOSISDBHSA-N

Acetoxolutamide is a nonsteroidal androgen and selective androgen receptor modulator (SARM) which was described in 2000 and was never developed or marketed for medical use. It was derived from structural modification of the nonsteroidal antiandrogen bicalutamide and the nonsteroidal SARM acetothiolutamide. Acetoxolutamide shows greatly improved pharmacokinetic properties and anabolic and androgenic potency relative to acetothiolutamide in animals. It is the (2R) enantiomer of andarine (also known as acetamidoxolutamide or androxolutamide).
