= 2020 Summer Olympics medal table =

2020 Summer Olympics medals
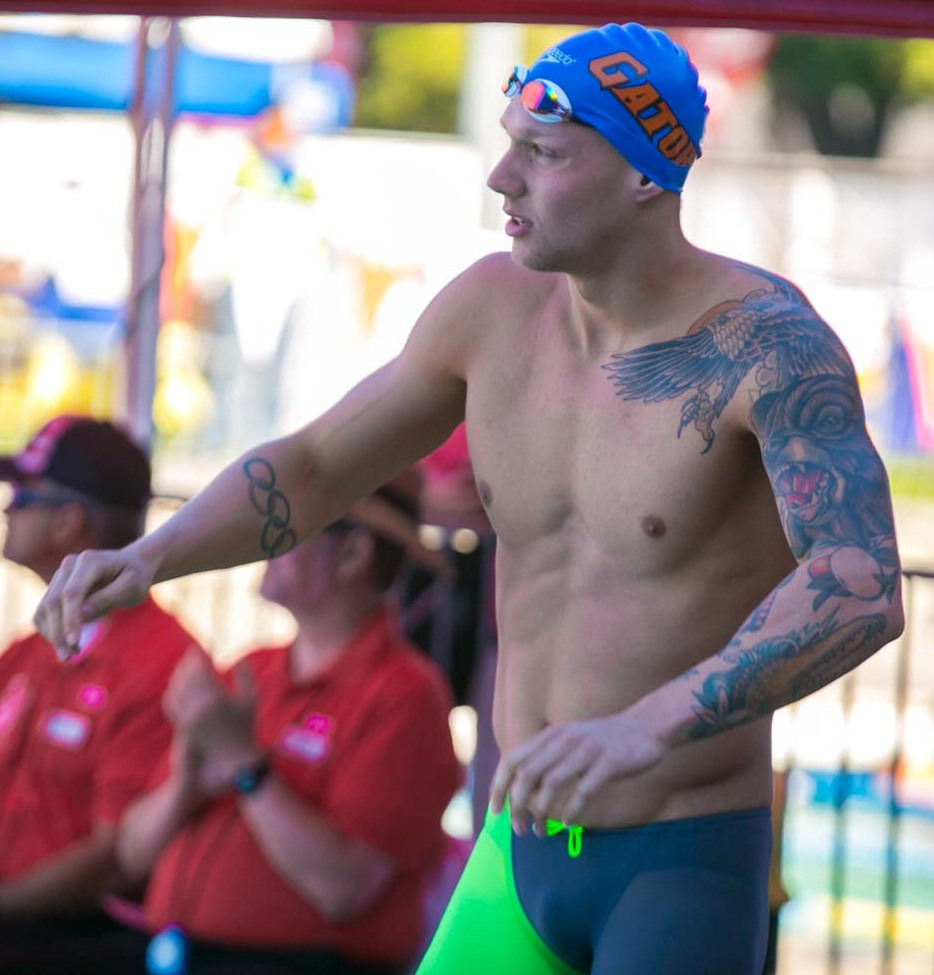
- Caeleb Dressel (pictured) won five gold medals at the 2020 Summer Olympics, the most of any competing athlete
- Location: Tokyo, Japan

Highlights
- Most gold medals: United States (39)
- Most total medals: United States (113)
- Medalling NOCs: 93

World map showing the medal achievements of each country during the 2020 Summer Olympics. Legend: represents countries that won at least one gold medal. represents countries that won at least one silver medal but no gold medals. represents countries that won at least one bronze medal but no gold or silver medals. represents countries that did not win any medals. represents entities that did not participate in the 2020 Summer Olympics. Notes. As a result of penalties imposed on Russia due to doping controversies, Russian athletes participated under the name of the Russian Olympic Committee (ROC) rather than the country itself. The Refugee Olympic Team is not represented on the map.

The number of the total medals of each team during the 2020 Summer Olympics.

The 2020 Summer Olympics, officially known as the Games of the XXXII Olympiad, were an international multi-sport event held in Tokyo, Japan, from 23 July to 8 August 2021. The Games were postponed by one year as part of the impact of the COVID-19 pandemic on sports. However, the Games was referred to by its original date in all medals, uniforms, promotional items, and other related media in order to avoid confusion in future years. A total of 11,417 athletes from 206 nations participated in 339 medal events in 33 sports across 50 disciplines.

Overall, the event saw two records: 93 nations received at least one medal, and 65 of them won at least one gold medal. Athletes from the United States won the most medals overall, with 113, and the most gold medals, with 39. Host nation Japan won 27 gold medals, surpassing its gold medal tally of 16 at both the 1964 and 2004 summer editions. Athletes from that nation also won 58 medals overall, which eclipsed its record of 41 overall medals won at the previous Summer Olympics.

American swimmer Caeleb Dressel won the most gold medals at the Games with five. Meanwhile, Australian swimmer Emma McKeon won the greatest number of medals overall, with seven in total. As a result, she tied Soviet gymnast Maria Gorokhovskaya's seven medals at the 1952 Summer edition for most medals won at a single Games by a female athlete. Bermuda, Qatar and the Philippines won their nations' first Olympic gold medals. Meanwhile, Burkina Faso, Turkmenistan and San Marino won their nations' first Olympic medals. (Note: However, Turkmen athletes had previously competed as nationals of the Russian Empire and of the Soviet Union, in particular during the 1992 Summer edition, where Turkmen athletes competed as part of the Unified Team.)

== Medals ==
The medals used for the 2020 Summer Olympics were designed by Junichi Kawanishi. They were manufactured using metal extracted from recycled small electronic devices donated by the public. The ribbon uses the traditional Japanese design motifs found in ichimatsu moyo (市松模様), a harmonised chequered pattern, and kasane no irome (重ね の 色目), a traditional kimono layering technique. The case is manufactured from Japanese ash wood dyed with the same colour as the Olympic emblem. The circular lid and the body of the case can be opened like a ring connected by a magnet. The obverse of the medals features Nike, the Greek goddess of victory, in front of Panathenaic Stadium and the Olympic rings.

As a result of safety protocols stemming from the COVID-19 pandemic, athletes were presented with their medals on trays, and were asked to put them on themselves (or each other, in the case of team winners), rather than having them placed around their necks by a dignitary.

== Medal table ==
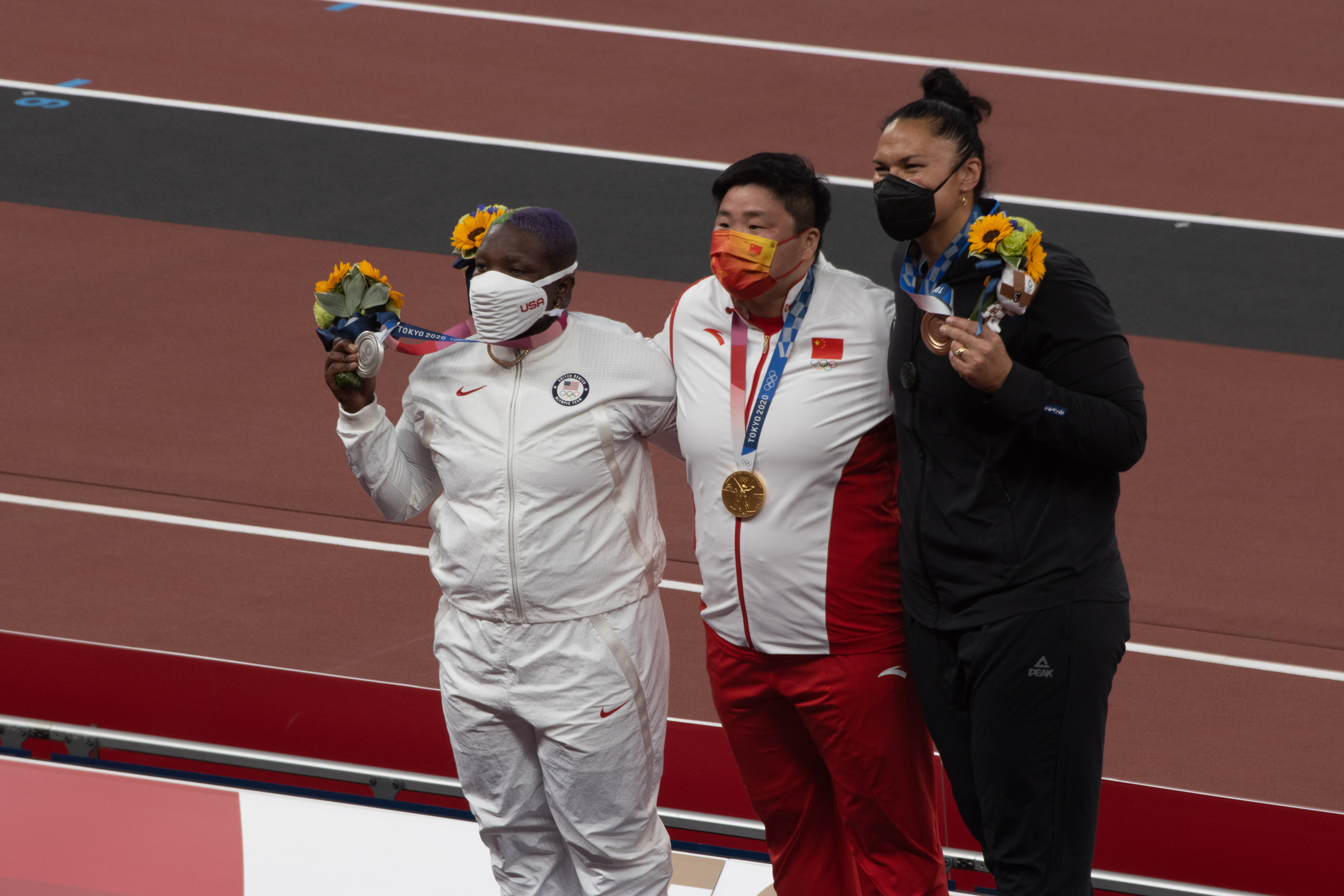
From left to right: Raven Saunders, Gong Lijiao, and Valerie Adams won silver, gold, and bronze respectively during the women's shot put event.

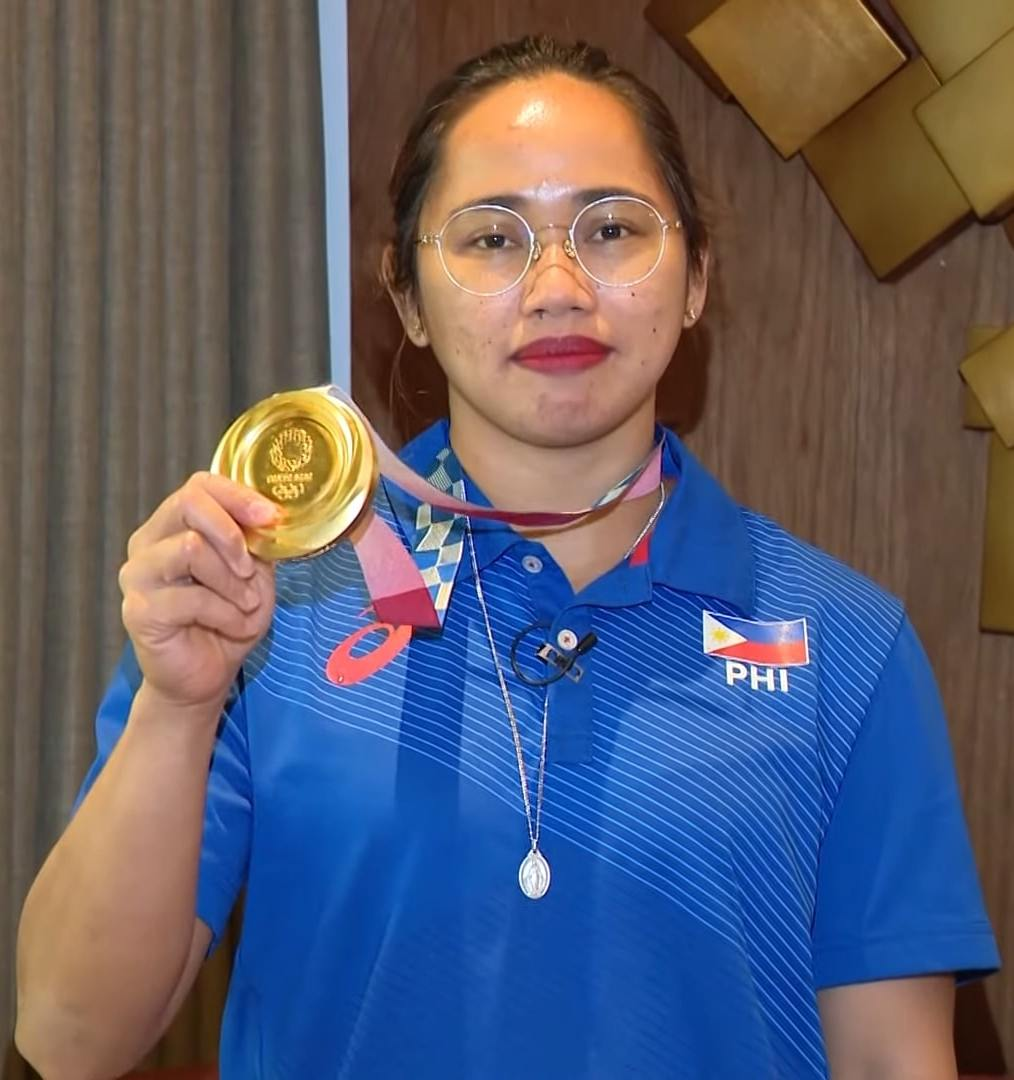
Weightlifter Hidilyn Diaz with her gold medal. Diaz is the Philippines' first-ever Olympic gold medalist.

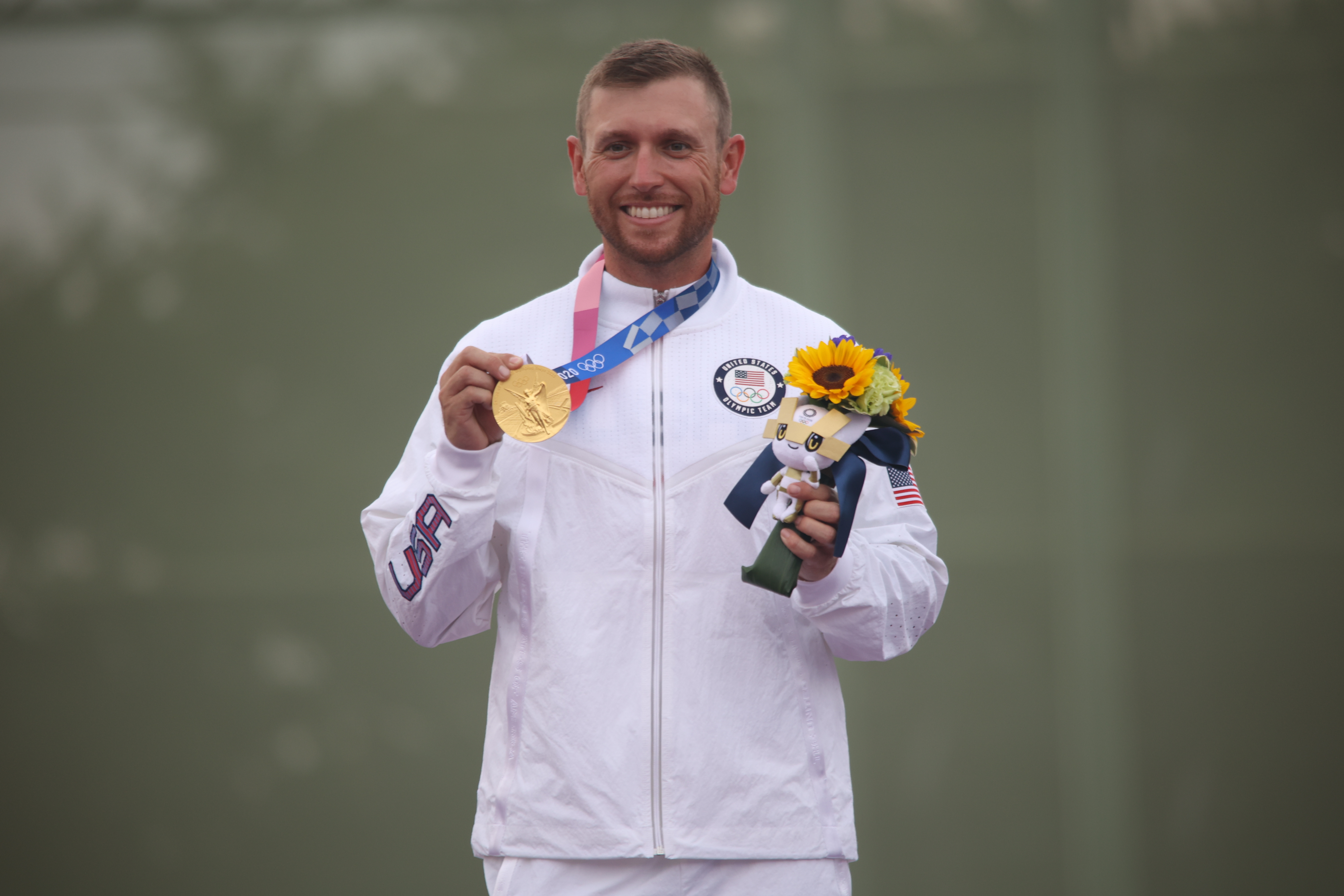
Vincent Hancock won a gold medal in the men's skeet competition. He became the first skeet shooter to win three gold medals in Olympic history, having previously won in 2008 and 2012.

The medal table is based on information provided by the International Olympic Committee (IOC) and is consistent with IOC convention in its published medal tables. The table uses the Olympic medal table sorting method. By default, the table is ordered by the number of gold medals the athletes from a nation have won, where a nation is an entity represented by a National Olympic Committee (NOC). The number of silver medals is taken into consideration next, and then the number of bronze medals. If teams are still tied, equal ranking is given and they are listed alphabetically by their IOC country code.

In boxing, judo, karate, taekwondo, and wrestling, two bronze medals are awarded in each weight class. Two gold medals (and no silver) were awarded to Mutaz Essa Barshim and Gianmarco Tamberi for a first-place tie in the men's high jump athletics event. Two bronze medals were awarded to Angelina Melnikova and Mai Murakami for a third-place tie in the women's floor gymnastics event.

Key

* Host nation (Japan)

2020 Summer Olympics medal table
Rank	NOC	Gold	Silver	Bronze	Total
1	United States	39	41	33	113
2	China	38	32	19	89
3	Japan*	27	14	17	58
4	Great Britain	22	20	22	64
5	ROC	20	28	23	71
6	Australia	17	7	22	46
7	Netherlands	10	12	14	36
8	France	10	12	11	33
9	Germany	10	11	16	37
10	Italy	10	10	20	40
11	Canada	7	7	10	24
12	Brazil	7	6	8	21
13	New Zealand	7	6	7	20
14	Cuba	7	3	5	15
15	Hungary	6	7	7	20
16	South Korea	6	4	10	20
17	Poland	4	5	5	14
18	Czech Republic	4	4	3	11
19	Kenya	4	4	2	10
20	Norway	4	2	2	8
21	Jamaica	4	1	4	9
22	Spain	3	8	6	17
23	Sweden	3	6	0	9
24	Switzerland	3	4	6	13
25	Denmark	3	4	4	11
26	Croatia	3	3	3	9
27	Iran	3	2	2	7
28	Serbia	3	1	4	8
29	Belgium	3	1	3	7
30	Bulgaria	3	1	2	6
31	Slovenia	3	1	1	5
32	Uzbekistan	3	0	2	5
33	Georgia	2	5	1	8
34	Chinese Taipei	2	4	6	12
35	Turkey	2	2	9	13
36	Greece	2	1	1	4
36	Uganda	2	1	1	4
38	Ecuador	2	1	0	3
39	Ireland	2	0	2	4
39	Israel	2	0	2	4
41	Qatar	2	0	1	3
42	Bahamas	2	0	0	2
42	Kosovo	2	0	0	2
44	Ukraine	1	6	12	19
45	Belarus	1	3	3	7
46	Romania	1	3	0	4
46	Venezuela	1	3	0	4
48	India	1	2	4	7
49	Hong Kong	1	2	3	6
50	Philippines	1	2	1	4
50	Slovakia	1	2	1	4
52	South Africa	1	2	0	3
53	Austria	1	1	5	7
54	Egypt	1	1	4	6
55	Indonesia	1	1	3	5
56	Ethiopia	1	1	2	4
56	Portugal	1	1	2	4
58	Tunisia	1	1	0	2
59	Estonia	1	0	1	2
59	Fiji	1	0	1	2
59	Latvia	1	0	1	2
59	Thailand	1	0	1	2
63	Bermuda	1	0	0	1
63	Morocco	1	0	0	1
63	Puerto Rico	1	0	0	1
66	Colombia	0	4	1	5
67	Azerbaijan	0	3	4	7
68	Dominican Republic	0	3	2	5
69	Armenia	0	2	2	4
70	Kyrgyzstan	0	2	1	3
71	Mongolia	0	1	3	4
72	Argentina	0	1	2	3
72	San Marino	0	1	2	3
74	Jordan	0	1	1	2
74	Malaysia	0	1	1	2
74	Nigeria	0	1	1	2
77	Bahrain	0	1	0	1
77	Lithuania	0	1	0	1
77	Namibia	0	1	0	1
77	North Macedonia	0	1	0	1
77	Saudi Arabia	0	1	0	1
77	Turkmenistan	0	1	0	1
83	Kazakhstan	0	0	8	8
84	Mexico	0	0	4	4
85	Finland	0	0	2	2
86	Botswana	0	0	1	1
86	Burkina Faso	0	0	1	1
86	Ghana	0	0	1	1
86	Grenada	0	0	1	1
86	Ivory Coast	0	0	1	1
86	Kuwait	0	0	1	1
86	Moldova	0	0	1	1
86	Syria	0	0	1	1
Totals (93 entries)		340	338	402	1,080

== Changes in medal standings ==
Key

※ Disqualified athlete(s)

List of official changes in medal standings
Ruling date	Sport/Event	Athlete (NOC)	1st place, gold medalist(s)	2nd place, silver medalist(s)	3rd place, bronze medalist(s)	Total	Notes
18 February 2022	Athletics; Men's 4 × 100 m	Great Britain Zharnel Hughes ※ Richard Kilty ※ Nethaneel Mitchell-Blake ※ CJ Ujah ※		−1		–1	On 12 August 2021, CJ Ujah of Great Britain was suspended from competition by World Athletics after testing positive for the banned substances S-23 and Enobosarm. Six months later, the IOC officially stripped his silver medal and requested Team GB to collect the medals from teammates Zharnel Hughes, Richard Kilty, and Nethaneel Mitchell-Blake. Canada's relay team received the silver medal, and China's relay team was awarded the bronze.
18 February 2022	Athletics; Men's 4 × 100 m	Canada Jerome Blake; Aaron Brown; Andre De Grasse; Brendon Rodney		+1	−1	0	On 12 August 2021, CJ Ujah of Great Britain was suspended from competition by World Athletics after testing positive for the banned substances S-23 and Enobosarm. Six months later, the IOC officially stripped his silver medal and requested Team GB to collect the medals from teammates Zharnel Hughes, Richard Kilty, and Nethaneel Mitchell-Blake. Canada's relay team received the silver medal, and China's relay team was awarded the bronze.
18 February 2022	Athletics; Men's 4 × 100 m	China Tang Xingqiang; Su Bingtian; Xie Zhenye; Wu Zhiqiang			+1	+1	On 12 August 2021, CJ Ujah of Great Britain was suspended from competition by World Athletics after testing positive for the banned substances S-23 and Enobosarm. Six months later, the IOC officially stripped his silver medal and requested Team GB to collect the medals from teammates Zharnel Hughes, Richard Kilty, and Nethaneel Mitchell-Blake. Canada's relay team received the silver medal, and China's relay team was awarded the bronze.
21 November 2025	Wrestling; Men's Greco-Roman 87 kg	Zurabi Datunashvili (SRB) ※			−1	−1	Zurabi Datunashvili of Serbia was stripped of his bronze medal in the men's Greco-Roman 87 kg wrestling event for doping. The IOC has redistributed the medal to Ivan Huklek of Croatia.

List of official changes by country
NOC	Gold	Silver	Bronze	Net Change
Great Britain	0	−1	0	−1
Serbia	0	0	−1	−1
Canada	0	+1	−1	0
China	0	0	+1	+1
Croatia	0	0	+1	+1

== See also ==
- All-time Olympic Games medal table
- 2020 Summer Paralympics medal table
