= C14H17ClN2O2 =

The molecular formula C_{14}H_{17}ClN_{2}O_{2} may refer to:

- LY305
- TIK-301
