= C14H13F3N2O2 =

The molecular formula C_{14}H_{13}F_{3}N_{2}O_{2} (molar mass: 298.265 g/mol) may refer to:

- CF3-Etomidate
- Compound 2f (SARM)
