= S-23 (drug) =

Investigational selective androgen receptor modulator

Clinical data
- Other names: Mastorin

Legal status
- Legal status: US: Investigational New Drug

Identifiers
- IUPAC name: (2S)-N-(4-cyano-3-trifluoromethylphenyl)-3-(3-fluoro-4-chlorophenoxy)-2-hydroxy-2-methyl-propanamide
- CAS Number: 1010396-29-8
- PubChem CID: 24892822
- DrugBank: DB07419
- ChemSpider: 24715019
- UNII: XDK89456WM
- CompTox Dashboard (EPA): DTXSID701045802

Chemical and physical data
- Formula: C_{18}H_{13}ClF_{4}N_{2}O_{3}
- Molar mass: 416.76 g·mol^{−1}
- 3D model (JSmol): Interactive image
- SMILES: C[C@](COC1=CC(=C(C=C1)Cl)F)(C(=O)NC2=CC(=C(C=C2)C#N)C(F)(F)F)O
- InChI: InChI=1S/C18H13ClF4N2O3/c1-17(27,9-28-12-4-5-14(19)15(20)7-12)16(26)25-11-3-2-10(8-24)13(6-11)18(21,22)23/h2-7,27H,9H2,1H3,(H,25,26)/t17-/m0/s1; Key:SSFVOEAXHZGTRJ-KRWDZBQOSA-N

S-23, also known as Mastorin, is an investigational selective androgen receptor modulator (SARM) developed by GTX, Inc as a potential male hormonal contraceptive. It binds to the androgen receptor more strongly than older drugs such as andarine with a K_{i} of 1.7 nM, and in animal studies it showed both a good ratio of anabolic to androgenic effects, and dose-dependent suppression of spermatogenesis with spontaneous recovery after cessation of treatment. It was encountered as a novel designer drug by 2020.
