= Acetothiolutamide =

Chemical compound

Clinical data
- Other names: Thioacetolutamide

Identifiers
- IUPAC name: (2R)-N-[4-cyano-3-(trifluoromethyl)phenyl]-3-[(4-acetamidophenyl)sulfanyl]-2-hydroxy-2-methylpropanamide
- CAS Number: 216665-38-2
- PubChem CID: 10873814
- ChemSpider: 9049091
- UNII: SW1TF3RGAH
- ChEMBL: ChEMBL121940
- CompTox Dashboard (EPA): DTXSID8040806

Chemical and physical data
- Formula: C_{20}H_{18}F_{3}N_{3}O_{3}S
- Molar mass: 437.44 g·mol^{−1}
- 3D model (JSmol): Interactive image
- SMILES: CC(=O)NC1=CC=C(C=C1)SCC(C)(C(=O)NC2=CC(=C(C=C2)C#N)C(F)(F)F)O
- InChI: InChI=1S/C20H18F3N3O3S/c1-12(27)25-14-5-7-16(8-6-14)30-11-19(2,29)18(28)26-15-4-3-13(10-24)17(9-15)20(21,22)23/h3-9,29H,11H2,1-2H3,(H,25,27)(H,26,28)/t19-/m0/s1; Key:FEDHYHIWSREKGN-IBGZPJMESA-N

Acetothiolutamide is a selective androgen receptor modulator (SARM) derived from the nonsteroidal antiandrogen bicalutamide that was described in 2002 and was one of the first SARMs to be discovered and developed. It is a high-affinity, selective ligand of the androgen receptor (AR) (K_{i} = 2.1–4.9 nM), where it acts as a full agonist in vitro, and has in vitro potency comparable to that of testosterone. However, in vivo, acetothiolutamide displayed overall negligible androgenic effects, though significant (albeit very low) anabolic effects were observed at high doses. In addition, notable antiandrogen effects were observed in castrated male rats treated with testosterone propionate. The discrepancy between the in vitro and in vivo actions of acetothiolutamide was determined to be related to rapid plasma clearance and extensive hepatic metabolism into a variety of metabolites with differing pharmacological activity, including AR partial agonism and antagonism. In accordance with its poor metabolic stability, acetothiolutamide is not orally bioavailable, and shows activity only via injected routes such as subcutaneous and intravenous.

== See also ==
- Andarine
- Enobosarm
- GTX-027
- LG-121071
