= Β-LGND2 =

Chemical compound

β-LGND2

Clinical data
- Other names: β-LGND2; ER-β-selective ligand 2
- Drug class: Nonsteroidal estrogen; Selective ERβ agonist

Identifiers
- IUPAC name: 4-bromo-6,8-dihydroxy-2-(4-hydroxyphenyl)isoquinolin-1-one
- CAS Number: 1462971-30-7 1644567-26-9
- PubChem CID: 24962206
- CompTox Dashboard (EPA): DTXSID401336369

Chemical and physical data
- Formula: C_{15}H_{10}BrNO_{4}
- Molar mass: 348.152 g·mol^{−1}
- 3D model (JSmol): Interactive image
- SMILES: C1=CC(=CC=C1N2C=C(C3=CC(=CC(=C3C2=O)O)O)Br)O
- InChI: InChI=1S/C15H10BrNO4/c16-12-7-17(8-1-3-9(18)4-2-8)15(21)14-11(12)5-10(19)6-13(14)20/h1-7,18-20H; Key:GLVQMSCCFOGRRG-UHFFFAOYSA-N

β-LGND2, also known as ERβ-selective ligand 2 or as GTx-878, is a synthetic nonsteroidal estrogen and selective ERβ agonist which was under development by GTx for the treatment of benign prostatic hyperplasia, prostatitis, and rheumatoid arthritis but was never marketed. It shows approximately 25-fold selectivity for activation of the ERβ over the ERα (EC_{50} = 2 nM and 52 nM, respectively). β-LGND2 is an isoquinolinone derivative.
