= GSK2881078 =

Chemical compound

Legal status
- Legal status: US: Investigational drug

Identifiers
- IUPAC name: 1-[(2R)-1-methylsulfonylpropan-2-yl]-4-(trifluoromethyl)indole-5-carbonitrile
- CAS Number: 1539314-06-1
- PubChem CID: 86709174
- ChemSpider: 57621607
- UNII: 47M5ZXU844

Chemical and physical data
- Formula: C_{14}H_{13}F_{3}N_{2}O_{2}S
- Molar mass: 330.33 g·mol^{−1}
- 3D model (JSmol): Interactive image
- SMILES: C[C@H](CS(=O)(=O)C)N1C=CC2=C1C=CC(=C2C(F)(F)F)C#N
- InChI: InChI=1S/C14H13F3N2O2S/c1-9(8-22(2,20)21)19-6-5-11-12(19)4-3-10(7-18)13(11)14(15,16)17/h3-6,9H,8H2,1-2H3/t9-/m1/s1; Key:SKDVMPZQJMZEAC-SECBINFHSA-N

GSK2881078 is a drug which acts as a selective androgen receptor modulator (SARM). It was developed for the prevention of muscle wasting and sarcopenia in elderly people.

In a phase II trial the drug was shown to be well tolerated and increased muscle strength in men with COPD.

== See also ==
- Enobosarm
- JNJ-28330835
- Ligandrol
