= GSK-2849466 =

Chemical compound

Clinical data
- Drug class: Selective androgen receptor modulator

Identifiers
- IUPAC name: 2,3-dichloro-4-[[(2S)-3-hydroxy-3-methylbutan-2-yl]amino]benzonitrile
- CAS Number: 2865213-83-6
- PubChem CID: 162623750
- ChemSpider: 129433093
- UNII: G6UPC5EU71

Chemical and physical data
- Formula: C_{12}H_{14}Cl_{2}N_{2}O
- Molar mass: 273.16 g·mol^{−1}
- 3D model (JSmol): Interactive image
- SMILES: C[C@@H](C(C)(C)O)NC1=C(C(=C(C=C1)C#N)Cl)Cl
- InChI: InChI=1S/C12H14Cl2N2O/c1-7(12(2,3)17)16-9-5-4-8(6-15)10(13)11(9)14/h4-5,7,16-17H,1-3H3/t7-/m0/s1; Key:KYBPRVBQMUAOFG-ZETCQYMHSA-N

GSK-2849466 is an investigational new drug that is a selective androgen receptor modulator (SARM) that was being developed by GlaxoSmithKline (GSK). This experimental compound reached Phase I clinical trials for the treatment of cachexia and heart failure. However, as of February 2014, GSK discontinued the development of GSK-2849466 for both indications after completing Phase I studies.
