= Arcarine =

Clinical data
- Other names: ORM-11984
- Drug class: Selective androgen receptor modulator

Arcarine (ORM-11984) is a selective androgen receptor modulator (SARM) developed by Orion Corporation, a Finnish pharmaceutical company. It belongs to a class of drugs designed to have tissue-selective androgenic effects, potentially offering the benefits of androgens while minimizing unwanted side effects. Arcarine was investigated for the treatment of various conditions, including benign prostatic hyperplasia, hypogonadism, and osteoporosis. The compound reached Phase I clinical trials before development was discontinued. Like other SARMs, Arcarine was developed to potentially provide anabolic effects in muscle and bone tissue while having reduced androgenic effects in other tissues, such as the prostate.
