= MK-3984 =

Chemical compound

Identifiers
- IUPAC name: (2R)-3,3,3-trifluoro-N-[[2-fluoro-5-(trifluoromethyl)phenyl]methyl]-2-hydroxy-2-phenylpropanamide
- CAS Number: 871325-55-2
- PubChem CID: 44555928
- ChemSpider: 52084488
- UNII: NDR4H1Q159

Chemical and physical data
- Formula: C_{17}H_{12}F_{7}NO_{2}
- Molar mass: 395.277 g·mol^{−1}
- InChI: InChI=InChI=1S/C17H12F7NO2/c18-13-7-6-12(16(19,20)21)8-10(13)9-25-14(26)15(27,17(22,23)24)11-4-2-1-3-5-11/h1-8,27H,9H2,(H,25,26)/t15-/m1/s1; Key:YSMGNNKNGUPHCD-OAHLLOKOSA-N

MK-3984 is a drug which acts as a selective androgen receptor modulator (SARM). It is no longer being developed.
