= AC-262,536 =

Chemical compound

Identifiers
- IUPAC name: 4-[(1R,3S,5S)-3-hydroxy-8-azabicyclo[3.2.1]octan-8-yl]naphthalene-1-carbonitrile
- CAS Number: 870888-46-3 871032-12-1 (exo form)
- PubChem CID: 44512434
- ChemSpider: 31129035
- UNII: U8VS41J5O6
- ChEMBL: ChEMBL3084525
- CompTox Dashboard (EPA): DTXSID201028423

Chemical and physical data
- Formula: C_{18}H_{18}N_{2}O
- Molar mass: 278.355 g·mol^{−1}
- 3D model (JSmol): Interactive image
- SMILES: OC1C[C@@H]2CC[C@H](C1)N2c3ccc(C#N)c4ccccc34
- InChI: InChI=1S/C18H18N2O/c19-11-12-5-8-18(17-4-2-1-3-16(12)17)20-13-6-7-14(20)10-15(21)9-13/h1-5,8,13-15,21H,6-7,9-10H2/t13-,14+,15+; Key:ATKWLNSCJYLXPF-FICVDOATSA-N

AC-262536, also known as Accadrine, is a drug developed by Acadia Pharmaceuticals which acts as a selective androgen receptor modulator (SARM). Chemically it possesses endo-exo isomerism, with the endo form being the active form. It acts as a partial agonist for the androgen receptor with a K_{i} of 5 nM, and no significant affinity for any other receptors tested. In animal studies it produced a maximal effect of around 66% of the levator ani muscle weight increase of testosterone, but only around 27% of its maximal effect on prostate gland weight. It is an aniline SARM related to ACP-105 and vosilasarm (RAD140). The drug was encountered as a novel designer drug by at least 2020.

== Medical uses ==
Accadrine is not approved for any medical use by the Food and Drug Administration and is not available as a licensed pharmaceutical drug as of 2025.

== Pharmacology ==
=== Pharmacodynamics ===
Accadrine is selective androgen receptor modulator (SARM), or a tissue-selective mixed agonist or partial agonist of the androgen receptor (AR). This receptor is the biological target of endogenous androgens like testosterone and dihydrotestosterone (DHT) and of synthetic anabolic steroids like nandrolone and oxandrolone. Accadrine shows high affinity for the AR, with a K_{i} value of 5 nM (relative to 29 nM for testosterone and 10 nM for DHT).
