= BMS-564,929 =

Chemical compound

Clinical data
- Other names: PS-178990

Legal status
- Legal status: US: Investigational New Drug

Identifiers
- IUPAC name: 4-[(7R,7aS)-7-hydroxy-1,3-dioxo-hexahydro-1H-pyrrolo[1,2-c]imidazol-2-yl]-2-chloro-3-methylbenzonitrile
- CAS Number: 627530-84-1
- PubChem CID: 9882972
- DrugBank: DB07286
- ChemSpider: 8058647
- UNII: 9BLW27W4X7
- ChEMBL: ChEMBL229264
- CompTox Dashboard (EPA): DTXSID50432357
- ECHA InfoCard: 100.233.303

Chemical and physical data
- Formula: C_{14}H_{12}ClN_{3}O_{3}
- Molar mass: 305.72 g·mol^{−1}
- 3D model (JSmol): Interactive image
- SMILES: CC1=C(C=CC(=C1Cl)C#N)N2C(=O)[C@@H]3[C@@H](CCN3C2=O)O
- InChI: InChI=1S/C14H12ClN3O3/c1-7-9(3-2-8(6-16)11(7)15)18-13(20)12-10(19)4-5-17(12)14(18)21/h2-3,10,12,19H,4-5H2,1H3/t10-,12+/m1/s1; Key:KEJORAMIZFOODM-PWSUYJOCSA-N

BMS-564,929 is an investigational selective androgen receptor modulator (SARM) which is being developed by Bristol-Myers Squibb for treatment of the symptoms of age-related decline in androgen levels in men ("andropause"). These symptoms may include depression, loss of muscle mass and strength, reduction in libido and osteoporosis. Treatment with exogenous testosterone is effective in counteracting these symptoms but is associated with a range of side effects, the most serious of which is enlargement of the prostate gland, which can lead to benign prostatic hyperplasia and even prostate cancer. This means there is a clinical need for selective androgen receptor modulators, which produce anabolic effects in some tissues such as muscle and bone, but without stimulating androgen receptors in the prostate.

BMS-564,929 is one such compound currently in early human clinical trials, which is an orally active, potent, and selective agonist for androgen receptors (Ki 2.1nM, 20x functional selectivity for muscle tissue over prostate) and in studies on castrated rats it was shown to counteract the decrease in muscle mass over time, and at higher doses even increased muscle mass, without significantly affecting prostate tissue. It does however vastly reduce luteinizing hormone levels, it being an astonishing 33× more suppressive compound than testosterone, which may be a problem in human clinical use.

Selective androgen receptor modulators may also be used by athletes to assist in training and increase physical stamina and fitness, potentially producing effects similar to anabolic steroids but with significantly fewer side effects. For this reason, SARMs have already been banned by the World Anti-Doping Agency since January 2008 despite no drugs from this class yet being in clinical use, and blood tests for all known SARMs are currently being developed.
