= GTx-027 =

Abandoned cancer drug

Clinical data
- Other names: GTx027
- Routes of administration: Oral
- Drug class: Selective androgen receptor modulator

Identifiers
- IUPAC name: (2S)-N-(3-chloro-4-cyanophenyl)-3-(4-cyanophenoxy)-2-hydroxy-2-methylpropanamide
- CAS Number: 928122-40-1
- PubChem CID: 23653581
- ChemSpider: 129985026

Chemical and physical data
- Formula: C_{18}H_{14}ClN_{3}O_{3}
- Molar mass: 355.78 g·mol^{−1}
- 3D model (JSmol): Interactive image
- SMILES: C[C@](COC1=CC=C(C=C1)C#N)(C(=O)NC2=CC(=C(C=C2)C#N)Cl)O
- InChI: InChI=1S/C18H14ClN3O3/c1-18(24,11-25-15-6-2-12(9-20)3-7-15)17(23)22-14-5-4-13(10-21)16(19)8-14/h2-8,24H,11H2,1H3,(H,22,23)/t18-/m0/s1; Key:IEGVUEFEHAFTNS-SFHVURJKSA-N

GTx-027 is a selective androgen receptor modulator (SARM) which was under development for or of potential interest in the treatment of breast cancer and stress urinary incontinence (SUI) but was never marketed. It is taken by mouth.

== Description ==
The drug is a nonsteroidal androgen receptor (AR) modulator with mixed agonistic (androgenic) and antagonistic (antiandrogenic) effects. It has been found to reduce the growth of androgen receptor-expressing MDA-MB-231 breast cancer cells in vitro. In addition, it has been found to increase pelvic floor muscle weight in ovariectomized female rodents. The drug has been found to increase body weight, lean body mass, and muscle strength in animals as well. In terms of chemical structure, GTx-027 is a nonsteroidal arylpropionamide SARM and is an analogue of enobosarm (ostarine; GTx-024).

GTx-027 was first described in the scientific literature by 2013. It is said to have either not passed preclinical research or to have reached phase 1 clinical trials prior to the discontinuation of its development. The drug was developed by GTx.
