= JNJ-37654032 =

Abandoned muscular atrophy drug

Clinical data
- Other names: JNJ37654032
- Drug class: Selective androgen receptor modulator

Identifiers
- IUPAC name: 2-(5,6-dichloro-1H-benzimidazol-2-yl)-1,1,1-trifluorobut-3-en-2-ol
- CAS Number: 944919-15-7
- PubChem CID: 23729483
- ChemSpider: 23307734
- UNII: K3976EA8Z4
- ChEMBL: ChEMBL246007

Chemical and physical data
- Formula: C_{11}H_{7}Cl_{2}F_{3}N_{2}O
- Molar mass: 311.09 g·mol^{−1}
- 3D model (JSmol): Interactive image
- SMILES: C=CC(C1=NC2=CC(=C(C=C2N1)Cl)Cl)(C(F)(F)F)O
- InChI: InChI=1S/C11H7Cl2F3N2O/c1-2-10(19,11(14,15)16)9-17-7-3-5(12)6(13)4-8(7)18-9/h2-4,19H,1H2,(H,17,18); Key:HEDZSNUSVHSSQI-UHFFFAOYSA-N

JNJ-37654032 is a selective androgen receptor modulator (SARM) which was developed by Johnson & Johnson for the potential treatment of muscular atrophy but was never marketed.

The drug is a nonsteroidal androgen receptor (AR) modulator with mixed agonistic (androgenic) and antagonistic (antiandrogenic) effects. In animals, it has shown full agonist-like effects in muscle, agonistic suppressive effects on follicle-stimulating hormone (FSH) secretion, and antagonistic or partially agonistic effects in the prostate. It was the lead compound of a novel benzimidazole series of SARMs described as being reminiscent of but distinct from the arylpropionamides (e.g., enobosarm).

JNJ-37654032 did not advance past the preclinical research and was never tested in humans. It was first described in the scientific literature by 2008.
