= GSK-971086 =

Chemical compound

Clinical data
- Drug class: Selective androgen receptor modulator

Identifiers
- IUPAC name: 2-methyl-4-(trifluoromethyl)-1-[[5-[3-(trifluoromethyl)phenyl]-1,2,4-oxadiazol-3-yl]methyl]indole-5-carbonitrile
- CAS Number: 1018971-95-3
- PubChem CID: 86620664
- ChemSpider: 129433018
- UNII: 8TFL50092H

Chemical and physical data
- Formula: C_{21}H_{12}F_{6}N_{4}O
- Molar mass: 450.344 g·mol^{−1}
- 3D model (JSmol): Interactive image
- SMILES: CC1=CC2=C(N1CC3=NOC(=N3)C4=CC(=CC=C4)C(F)(F)F)C=CC(=C2C(F)(F)F)C#N
- InChI: InChI=1S/C21H12F6N4O/c1-11-7-15-16(6-5-13(9-28)18(15)21(25,26)27)31(11)10-17-29-19(32-30-17)12-3-2-4-14(8-12)20(22,23)24/h2-8H,10H2,1H3; Key:ZEDODTZELVBHTG-UHFFFAOYSA-N

GSK-971086 is an investigational new drug that is a selective androgen receptor modulator (SARM) that was being developed by GlaxoSmithKline (GSK) for the potential treatment of sarcopenia. As a SARM, GSK-971086 was designed to target androgen receptors in specific tissues, potentially offering therapeutic benefits for muscle wasting conditions while minimizing unwanted androgenic side effects. The compound underwent early-stage clinical trials to evaluate its safety, tolerability, and pharmacokinetic profile in human subjects.
