= Compound 2f (SARM) =

Chemical compound

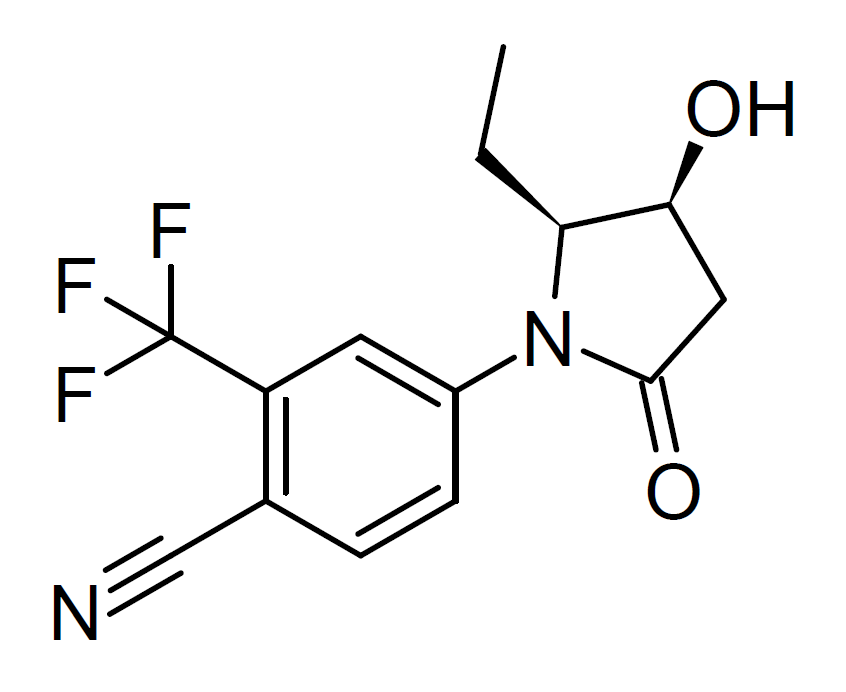

Legal status
- Legal status: Investigational

Identifiers
- IUPAC name: 4-[(2S,3S)-2-ethyl-3-hydroxy-5-oxopyrrolidin-1-yl]-2-(trifluoromethyl)benzonitrile
- CAS Number: 1114546-03-0
- PubChem CID: 59556974
- ChemSpider: 59053603
- ChEMBL: ChEMBL4088914

Chemical and physical data
- Formula: C_{14}H_{13}F_{3}N_{2}O_{2}
- Molar mass: 298.265 g·mol^{−1}
- 3D model (JSmol): Interactive image
- SMILES: CC[C@H]1[C@H](CC(=O)N1C2=CC(=C(C=C2)C#N)C(F)(F)F)O
- InChI: InChI=1S/C14H13F3N2O2/c1-2-11-12(20)6-13(21)19(11)9-4-3-8(7-18)10(5-9)14(15,16)17/h3-5,11-12,20H,2,6H2,1H3/t11-,12-/m0/s1; Key:LJQBTMVNFWIQQC-RYUDHWBXSA-N

Compound 2f (SARM) is a drug which acts as a selective androgen receptor modulator (SARM), originally developed by Takeda Pharmaceutical for the treatment of prostate cancer. It is a potent but tissue specific androgen agonist with an EC_{50} of 4.7nM, producing anabolic effects on muscles and in the central nervous system but with little effect on the prostate gland, and inducing sexual behaviour in animal studies.

== See also ==
- LY305
