= LY305 =

Chemical compound

Legal status
- Legal status: Investigational

Identifiers
- IUPAC name: 2-Chloro-4-[[(1R,2R)-2-hydroxy-2-methylcyclopentyl]amino]-3-methylbenzonitrile
- CAS Number: 1430230-83-3
- PubChem CID: 71543393
- ChemSpider: 58921204
- UNII: QT1QL22BEO
- ChEMBL: ChEMBL3764185

Chemical and physical data
- Formula: C_{14}H_{17}ClN_{2}O
- Molar mass: 264.75 g·mol^{−1}
- 3D model (JSmol): Interactive image
- SMILES: CC1=C(C=CC(=C1Cl)C#N)N[C@@H]2CCC[C@@]2(C)O
- InChI: InChI=1S/C14H17ClN2O/c1-9-11(6-5-10(8-16)13(9)15)17-12-4-3-7-14(12,2)18/h5-6,12,17-18H,3-4,7H2,1-2H3/t12-,14-/m1/s1; Key:CXFSVKGROITHRY-TZMCWYRMSA-N

LY305 is a transdermally bioavailable selective androgen receptor modulator (SARM) developed by Eli Lilly for the treatment of osteoporosis in men. Its chemical structure includes N-arylhydroxyalkyl. A phase one trial found promising results.

== See also ==
- Compound 2f (SARM)
