= Biobucks =

Terms for financial transactions between pharmaceutical and biotechnology industries

Biobucks are milestone payments specified in partnership agreements between large pharmaceutical and smaller biotechnology companies. While public announcements of these deals often state a single lump-sum figure as a representation of the entire deal-value, often only a small fraction of the amount is certain, while the remaining amount is highly uncertain.

Common transactions in this industry are based on the grant of a license for products emerging from a drug discovery program or for a candidate drug that is already in development in exchange for money. The risk for both parties is managed in the license agreement by spreading the payments over time, and making most of the payment contingent on sales through royalty payments, and on reaching milestones such as completion of a clinical trial phase, regulatory marketing approval in various jurisdictions, or a reaching some level of sales, through so-called "milestone payments". The licensee may also agree to make payments to the licensor specifically to fund continued work on the licensed product (research funding).

Only the upfront payment and research funding are paid out when the deal is signed; the rest is all contingent and may never be paid or received.
