= ACP-105 =

Chemical compound

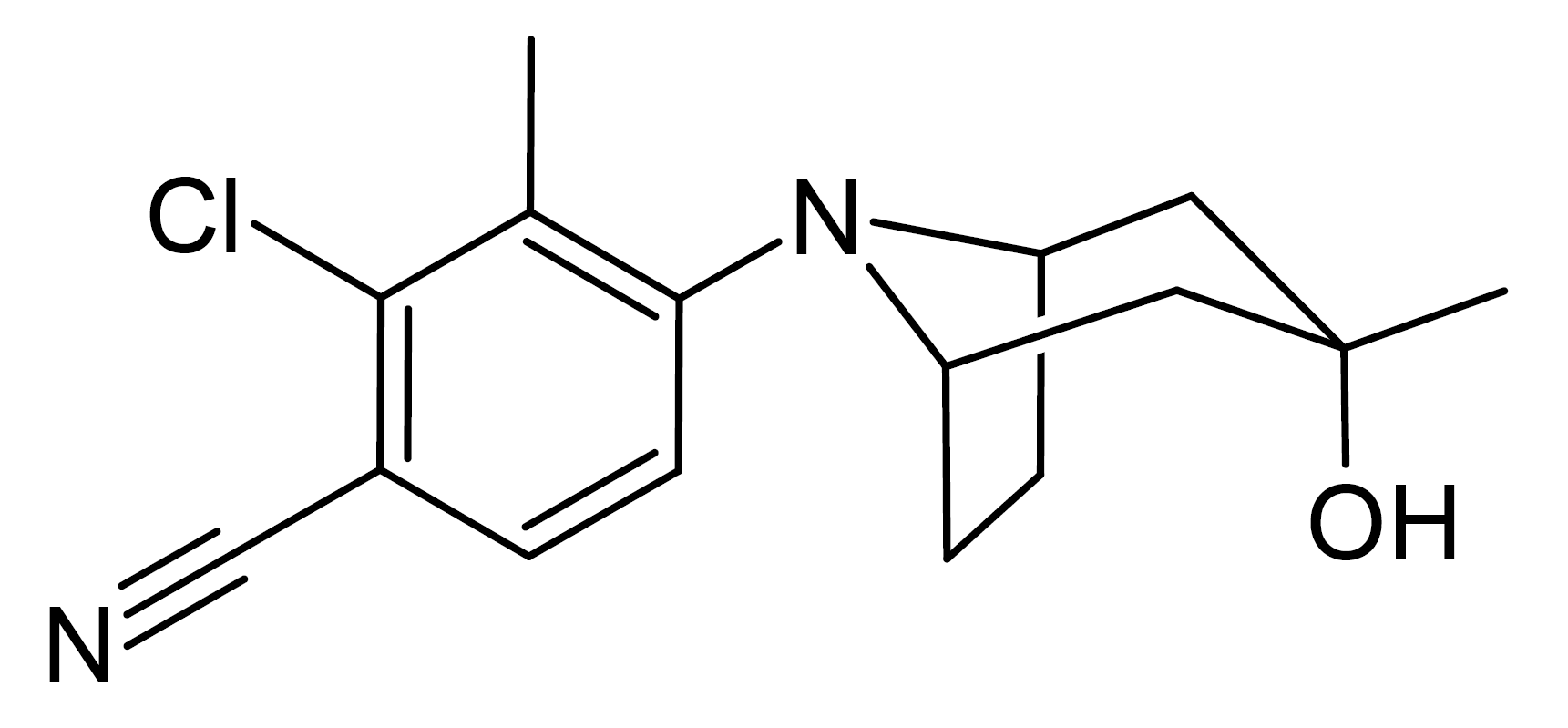

Legal status
- Legal status: US: Investigational new drug

Identifiers
- IUPAC name: 2-chloro-4-(3-hydroxy-3-methyl-8-azabicyclo[3.2.1]octan-8-yl)-3-methylbenzonitrile
- CAS Number: 1048998-11-3
- PubChem CID: 11507567
- ChemSpider: 9682364
- UNII: M663M24PL3
- ChEMBL: ChEMBL3410856
- CompTox Dashboard (EPA): DTXSID101134942

Chemical and physical data
- Formula: C_{16}H_{19}ClN_{2}O
- Molar mass: 290.79 g·mol^{−1}
- 3D model (JSmol): Interactive image
- SMILES: CC1=C(C=CC(=C1Cl)C#N)N2C3CCC2CC(C3)(C)O
- InChI: InChI=1S/C16H19ClN2O/c1-10-14(6-3-11(9-18)15(10)17)19-12-4-5-13(19)8-16(2,20)7-12/h3,6,12-13,20H,4-5,7-8H2,1-2H3; Key:OUEODVPKPRQETQ-UHFFFAOYSA-N

ACP-105 is a drug which acts as a selective androgen receptor modulator (SARM). It has been investigated for potential use in the treatment of age-related cognitive decline. The drug has been found to reduce anxiety-like behavior in a mouse model of Alzheimer's disease when administered alone, as well as enhance spatial memory when coadministered with the selective estrogen receptor β agonist AC-186. ACP-105 is an aniline SARM and is related to AC-262536 and vosilasarm (RAD140).
