= Andarine =

Chemical compound

Clinical data
- Other names: GTx-007; S-4; Acetamidoxolutamide; Androxolutamide; Acetam-doxolutamide
- ATC code: None

Legal status
- Legal status: US: Investigational New Drug

Identifiers
- IUPAC name: (2S)-3-(4-acetamido-phenoxy)-2-hydroxy-2-methyl-N-(4-nitro-3-trifluoromethyl-phenyl)-propionamide
- CAS Number: 401900-40-1
- PubChem CID: 9824562
- IUPHAR/BPS: 7849
- DrugBank: DB07423
- ChemSpider: 8000309
- UNII: 7UT2HAH49H
- ChEMBL: ChEMBL125236
- CompTox Dashboard (EPA): DTXSID40193187
- ECHA InfoCard: 100.230.653

Chemical and physical data
- Formula: C_{19}H_{18}F_{3}N_{3}O_{6}
- Molar mass: 441.363 g·mol^{−1}
- 3D model (JSmol): Interactive image
- SMILES: FC(F)(F)c1cc(ccc1[N+]([O-])=O)NC(=O)[C@@](O)(COc2ccc(cc2)NC(=O)C)C
- InChI: InChI=1S/C19H18F3N3O6/c1-11(26)23-12-3-6-14(7-4-12)31-10-18(2,28)17(27)24-13-5-8-16(25(29)30)15(9-13)19(20,21)22/h3-9,28H,10H2,1-2H3,(H,23,26)(H,24,27)/t18-/m0/s1; Key:YVXVTLGIDOACBJ-SFHVURJKSA-N

Andarine (developmental code names GTx-007, S-4) is a selective androgen receptor modulator (SARM) which was developed by GTX, Inc for the treatment of conditions such as muscle wasting, osteoporosis, and benign prostatic hyperplasia (BPH), using the nonsteroidal antiandrogen bicalutamide as a lead compound. Development of andarine for all indications has been discontinued, in favor of the structurally related and improved compound enobosarm (ostarine; GTx-024; S-22).

Andarine is an orally active partial agonist of the androgen receptor (AR). In intact male rats, 0.5 mg andarine daily was shown to reduce prostate weight to 79.4%, and non-significantly increased levator ani muscle weight. In castrated male rats, this dose restored only 32.5% prostate weight, but 101% levator ani muscle weight This suggests that andarine is able to competitively block binding of dihydrotestosterone to its receptor targets in the prostate gland, but its partial agonist actions at the androgen receptor prevent the side effects associated with the antiandrogens traditionally used for treatment of BPH.

Andarine was first described in the literature by 2002. It completed phase 1 clinical trials for cachexia in 2003. Three phase 1 trials (1a, 1b, 1c) were completed with the drug involving 86 healthy male and female volunteers. Phase 2 trials were planned for 2004. However, development of andarine was discontinued, reportedly due to findings of visual disturbances in clinical studies. Andarine is thought to have been the first SARM to enter human clinical trials.

== See also ==
- Acetothiolutamide
- GTx-027
