= GTx Incorporated =

Pharmaceutical company

GTx, Inc.
- Company type: Public
- Traded as: Nasdaq: ONCT
- Industry: Pharmaceuticals
- Founded: September 24, 1997
- Headquarters: Memphis, Tennessee, United States
- Products: Enobosarm
- Website: www.gtxinc.com

GTx, Inc. was a pharmaceutical company working on drugs in the selective estrogen receptor modulator (SERM) and selective androgen receptor modulator (SARM) classes. Its drugs in development included enobosarm (ostarine) and GTx-758.

The company was founded in Memphis in 1997 by Mitch Steiner and Marc S. Hanover. The company was originally called Genotherapeutics, changed its name to GTx, Inc. in 2001, and reincorporated in Delaware in 2003. The company licensed toremifene from Orion Corporation, and licensed andarine, enobosarm and prostarine from the University of Tennessee Research Foundation; the SARM compounds from Tennessee had been invented by Duane D Miller and James T Dalton, who later joined the company and served as Chief Scientific Officer. The company held its IPO in February 2004.

In 2006 GTx signed a partnership with Ipsen to develop toremifene, a selective estrogen receptor modulator to prevent prostate cancer and to prevent bone loss in men with prostate cancer; the FDA rejected the application to market the drug for this use in 2009, and Ipsen terminated the arrangement in 2011. In 2012 GTx sold its rights to toremifene to ProStrakan, a subsidiary of Kyowa Hakko Kirin, for around $19 million, and terminated its agreement with Orion.

By 2007 enobosarm was in a Phase II trial, and that year GTx signed an exclusive license agreement for its SARM program with Merck; Merck bought $30M in GtX stock, paid an upfront fee of $40M, and agreed to fund $15M in research over the next three years. The agreement also included royalties on any product brought to market and around $400M in biodollars. The companies ended the deal in 2010.

In August 2013 GTx announced that enobosarm had failed in two Phase III clinical trials to treat wasting in people with lung cancer. In October 2013 the company laid off around 60% of its 88-person workforce, and Steiner resigned 6 months later. The company had invested around $35 million in the development of the drug. The company said at that time that is planned to pursue approval of enobosarm in Europe; the company was also still developing GTx-758 for castration-resistant prostate cancer.

In 2016 GTx began Phase II trials, to see if enosobarm might be effective to treat stress urinary incontinence in women.

In June 2019, GTx combined with Oncternal Therapeutics in a reverse merger, with the resulting company operating under the name Oncternal Therapeutics, Inc.
