= JNJ-28330835 =

Chemical compound

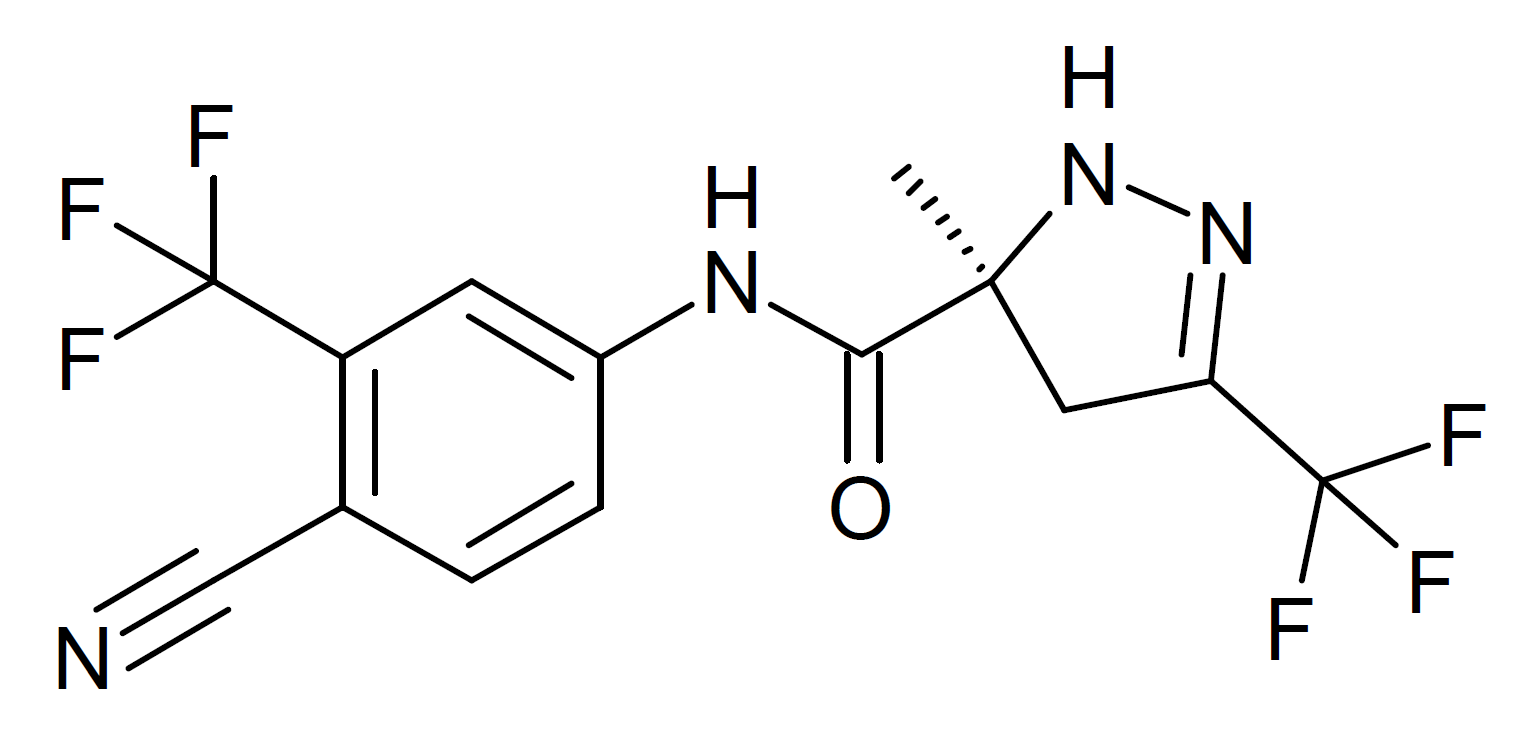

Clinical data
- Other names: JNJ28330835
- Drug class: Selective androgen receptor modulator

Legal status
- Legal status: US: Investigational drug

Identifiers
- IUPAC name: (S)-N-(4-cyano-3-(trifluoromethyl)phenyl)-5-methyl-3-(trifluoromethyl)-4,5-dihydro-1H-pyrazole-5-carboxamide
- CAS Number: 888072-47-7
- PubChem CID: 11703306
- DrugBank: DB13936
- ChemSpider: 9878029
- UNII: 544SF265DA
- ChEMBL: ChEMBL242469
- CompTox Dashboard (EPA): DTXSID201336525

Chemical and physical data
- Formula: C_{14}H_{10}F_{6}N_{4}O
- Molar mass: 364.251 g·mol^{−1}
- 3D model (JSmol): Interactive image
- SMILES: O=C([C@@]1(C)NN=C(C(F)(F)F)C1)NC2=CC=C(C#N)C(C(F)(F)F)=C2
- InChI: InChI=1S/C14H10F6N4O/c1-12(5-10(23-24-12)14(18,19)20)11(25)22-8-3-2-7(6-21)9(4-8)13(15,16)17/h2-4,24H,5H2,1H3,(H,22,25)/t12-/m0/s1; Key:RYBKPGYFXRNMMU-LBPRGKRZSA-N

JNJ-28330835 is a drug which acts as a selective androgen receptor modulator (SARM). In studies on rats it was found to enhance muscle growth and sexual behavior but with minimal effects on prostate gland size. A number of related compounds are known, though JNJ-28330835 has progressed furthest through development. The drug is a potential designer drug, though it has not yet been encountered as of 2020.

== See also ==
- JNJ-26146900
- JNJ-37654032
