= Enobosarm =

Investigational selective androgen receptor modulator

Clinical data
- Other names: Ostarine; GTx-024; MK-2866; S-22; VERU-024
- Routes of administration: By mouth
- ATC code: None

Legal status
- Legal status: US: Investigational New Drug

Pharmacokinetic data
- Bioavailability: 100% (rats)
- Metabolism: CYP3A4, UGT1A1, UGT2B7
- Metabolites: Enobosarm glucuronide
- Elimination half-life: 14–24 hours
- Excretion: Feces (70%), urine (21–25%) (rats)

Identifiers
- IUPAC name: ((2S)-3-(4-cyanophenoxy)-N-[4-cyano-3-(trifluoromethyl)phenyl]-2-hydroxy-2-methylpropanamide)
- CAS Number: 841205-47-8
- PubChem CID: 11326715
- DrugBank: DB12078
- ChemSpider: 9501667
- UNII: O3571H3R8N
- KEGG: D10221
- ChEMBL: ChEMBL1738889
- PDB ligand: RLJ (PDBe, RCSB PDB)
- CompTox Dashboard (EPA): DTXSID30233006

Chemical and physical data
- Formula: C_{19}H_{14}F_{3}N_{3}O_{3}
- Molar mass: 389.334 g·mol^{−1}
- 3D model (JSmol): Interactive image
- Melting point: 132 to 136 °C (270 to 277 °F)
- SMILES: C[C@](O)(COc1ccc(C#N)cc1)C(=O)Nc1ccc(C#N)c(C(F)(F)F)c1
- InChI: InChI=1S/C19H14F3N3O3/c1-18(27,11-28-15-6-2-12(9-23)3-7-15)17(26)25-14-5-4-13(10-24)16(8-14)19(20,21)22/h2-8,27H,11H2,1H3,(H,25,26)/t18-/m0/s1; Key:JNGVJMBLXIUVRD-SFHVURJKSA-N

Enobosarm, also formerly known as ostarine and by the developmental code names GTx-024, MK-2866, and S-22, is a selective androgen receptor modulator (SARM) which is under development for the treatment of androgen receptor-positive breast cancer in women and for improvement of body composition (e.g., prevention of muscle loss) in people taking GLP-1 receptor agonists like semaglutide. It was also under development for a variety of other indications, including treatment of cachexia, Duchenne muscular dystrophy, muscle atrophy or sarcopenia, and stress urinary incontinence, but development for all other uses has been discontinued. Enobosarm was evaluated for the treatment of muscle wasting related to cancer in late-stage clinical trials, and the drug improved lean body mass in these trials, but it was not effective in improving muscle strength. As a result, enobosarm was not approved and development for this use was terminated. Enobosarm is taken by mouth.

Known possible side effects of enobosarm include headache, fatigue, anemia, nausea, diarrhea, back pain, adverse lipid changes like decreased high-density lipoprotein (HDL) cholesterol levels, changes in sex hormone concentrations like decreased testosterone levels, elevated liver enzymes, and liver toxicity, among others. The potential masculinizing effects of enobosarm, for instance in women, have largely not been evaluated and are unknown. The potential adverse effects and risks of high doses of enobosarm are also unknown. Enobosarm is a nonsteroidal SARM, acting as an agonist of the androgen receptor (AR), the biological target of androgens and anabolic steroids like testosterone and dihydrotestosterone (DHT). However, it shows dissociation of effect between tissues in preclinical studies, with agonistic and anabolic effects in muscle and bone, agonistic effects in breast, and partially agonistic or antagonistic effects in the prostate gland and seminal vesicles. The AR-mediated effects of enobosarm in many other androgen-sensitive tissues are unknown.

Enobosarm was first identified in 2004 and has been under clinical development since at least 2005. It is the most well-studied SARM of all of the agents that have been developed. According to GTx, its developer, a total of 25 clinical studies have been carried out on more than 1,700 people involving doses from 1 to 100 mg as of 2020. However, enobosarm has not yet completed clinical development or been approved for any use. As of November 2023, it is in phase 3 clinical trials for the treatment of breast cancer and is in phase 2 studies for improvement of body composition in people taking GLP-1 receptor agonists. Enobosarm was developed by GTx, Inc., and is now being developed by Veru, Inc.

Aside from its development as a potential pharmaceutical drug, enobosarm is on the World Anti-Doping Agency list of prohibited substances and is sold for physique- and performance-enhancing purposes by black-market Internet suppliers. In one survey, 2.7% of young male gym users reported using SARMs. In addition, a London wastewater analysis found that enobosarm was the most abundant "pharmaceutical drug" detected and was more prevalent than "classical" recreational drugs like MDMA and cocaine. Enobosarm is often used in these contexts at doses greatly exceeding those evaluated in clinical trials, with unknown effectiveness and safety. Many products sold online that are purported to be enobosarm either contain none or contain other unrelated substances. Social media has played an important role in facilitating the widespread non-medical use of SARMs.

== Medical uses ==
Enobosarm is not approved for any medical use and is not available as a licensed pharmaceutical drug as of 2023.

== Side effects ==
General side effects that have been reported with enobosarm in clinical trials include headache, fatigue, anemia, nausea, diarrhea, and back pain.

Enobosarm has shown dose-related adverse effects on serum lipids, sex hormone and gonadotropin levels, and carrier protein levels in clinical trials. It decreases HDL cholesterol levels, reducing them dose-dependently by 17% at a dose of 1 mg/day and by 27% at a dose of 3 mg/day. Decreases in total cholesterol levels and in triglyceride levels have also been seen, whereas LDL cholesterol levels are unchanged. In healthy elderly men, total testosterone levels decreased significantly at doses of 1 and 3 mg/day (-31% and -57%, respectively), whereas levels of free testosterone, dihydrotestosterone (DHT), estradiol, luteinizing hormone (LH), and follicle-stimulating hormone (FSH) did not change significantly at doses up to 3 mg/day. In healthy postmenopausal women, LH and FSH decreased significantly only at the 3 mg/day dose (-17% and -30%, respectively), whereas levels of total testosterone, free testosterone, DHT, and estradiol did not clearly change relative to placebo. SHBG levels were lowered at doses of 1 to 3 mg/day, decreasing dramatically by 61% in men and by 80% in women at the 3 mg/day dose. For comparison, testosterone enanthate by intramuscular injection at a highly supraphysiological dose of 600 mg/week resulted in only a 31% decrease in SHBG levels. Despite the large changes in SHBG levels, levels of free testosterone did not significantly change in either men or women. Small but significant increases in hemoglobin and hematocrit, and small but significant decreases in fasting blood glucose, insulin levels, and insulin resistance, have been observed with enobosarm at 3 mg/day.

In small short-term (3-month) clinical trials in healthy elderly or postmenopausal women, enobosarm at doses ranging from 0.1 to 3 mg/day had mixed effects on sebum production and did not increase body hair growth or cause hirsutism. These effects are measures of androgenic action in skin and hair follicles. In the first study, at doses of 0.1 to 3 mg/day, there were no significant changes relative to placebo in sebum tape scores with enobosarm and there were no consistent increases in Ferriman–Gallwey score, with most women having no change in score or a decreased score and only one having an increase in score. In the second study, which employed 3 mg/day enobosarm, there was a significant 1.25-fold increase in sebum production from baseline and a significant 1.5-fold increase in sebum production relative to placebo. No differences in sebaceous gland volume were apparent upon histological examination in this study.

At doses ranging from 0.1 to 18 mg/day in clinical trials, enobosarm has been associated with elevated liver enzymes in subsets of individuals. Rates of elevated liver enzymes or of elevated alanine aminotransferase (ALT) levels have ranged from 0.6% to 33% in these trials. Liver enzyme elevations with enobosarm are often transient and resolve spontaneously. However, markedly elevated liver enzymes have occasionally occurred with enobosarm in clinical trials and have necessitated discontinuation. There have been several published case reports of hepatotoxicity with enobosarm as of 2023. Between 2020 and 2022, there has been a rapid increase in reported cases of liver toxicity with SARMs. The hepatotoxicity with SARMs may be related to their resistance to hepatic metabolism, analogously to the case of 17α-alkylated anabolic steroids.

SARMs are often advertised and sold on the Internet at doses higher than have been described in the literature. Sometimes doses are recommended as several-fold or more greater than the doses used in clinical trials, or seemingly arbitrary doses are advised. For instance, enobosarm has been provided at doses of greater than or equal to 20 mg per serving and recommended by bodybuilders and fitness enthusiasts at doses of 10 to 30 mg/day, relative to the most widely assessed highest dose in clinical trials of 3 mg/day—an up to 10-fold difference. SARMs, particularly when used at high or excessive doses for prolonged periods of time, may result in substantial suppression of endogenous sex hormones like testosterone and estradiol, in turn producing widespread unintended deleterious effects on physiological function. As examples, SARMs may produce potent anabolic effects with deficiency in important androgenic effects, may result in estrogen deficiency with consequences like bone loss among others, and, due to suppression of the hypothalamic–pituitary–gonadal axis (HPG axis), may cause infertility.

Androgens and anabolic steroids like testosterone, dihydrotestosterone (DHT), nandrolone, and oxandrolone, which are full agonists of the androgen receptor, produce virilizing or masculinizing effects like increased sebum production and acne, increased body hair growth, scalp hair loss, voice deepening, increased muscle mass, android fat redistribution, skeletal changes like widening of the shoulders and skull/facial changes, and genital growth both in males and females. SARMs, which are tissue-selective mixed or partial agonists of the androgen receptor, are largely uncharacterized in terms of their masculinizing effects, but are likely to produce many of the same effects. SARMs specifically may be expected to retain masculinizing effects like increased muscle mass and bone changes, while possibly having reduced virilizing effects in certain other areas like androgenic skin and hair changes. Anecdotal reports of masculinization with SARMs in women exist in online forums.

The United States Food and Drug Administration (FDA) has cautioned that SARMs could have serious adverse effects ranging from risk of heart attack to stroke and liver damage and has warned against their use in bodybuilding products.

== Overdose ==
Enobosarm has been assessed in clinical trials at doses ranging from 0.1 to 18 mg/day. However, most research has been done at doses of 0.1 to 3 mg/day, with two phase 3 clinical trials using a dosage of 3 mg/day. A few small phase 1 and phase 2 trials of enobosarm for breast cancer have employed doses of 9 to 18 mg/day. Larger, phase 3 trials of enobosarm at a dose of 9 mg/day for breast cancer (e.g., ARTEST, n=210) are now underway. Doses of up to 100 mg have been assessed in single-dose pharmacokinetic studies and doses of up to 30 mg/day have been given in short 14-day pharmacokinetic studies. Enobosarm sold via black-market Internet suppliers and used non-medically is often taken at much higher doses than those used widely in clinical trials (e.g., 10–30 mg/day), with unknown adverse effects and risks.

== Interactions ==
Enobosarm is a substrate of the cytochrome P450 enzyme CYP3A4 and the UDP-glucuronosyltransferase (UGT) enzymes UGT1A1 and UGT2B7. It shows very minimal metabolism by cytochrome P50 enzymes, with CYP3A4 merely responsible for the greatest degree of metabolism. Since enobosarm is metabolized by CYP3A4, UGT1A1, and UGT2B7, inhibitors and inducers of these enzymes can modify the metabolism and pharmacokinetics of enobosarm. The strong CYP3A4 inhibitor itraconazole was shown to have minimal to no influence on the pharmacokinetics of enobosarm, whereas the strong CYP3A4 inducer rifampin reduced enobosarm peak levels by 23%, elimination half-life by 23%, and area-under-the-curve levels by 43%. The pan-UGT inhibitor probenecid was shown to not affect peak levels of enobosarm but to increase the elimination half-life of enobosarm by 78% and to increase area-under-the-curve levels of enobosarm by 50%. Enobosarm had no effect on the pharmacokinetics of celecoxib (a CYP2C9 substrate) or rosuvastatin (a BCRP substrate). Based on the preceding findings, it was concluded that enobosarm poses low risk for clinically relevant drug interactions.

== Pharmacology ==
=== Pharmacodynamics ===
Enobosarm is a selective androgen receptor modulator (SARM), or a tissue-selective mixed agonist or partial agonist of the androgen receptor (AR). This receptor is the biological target of endogenous androgens like testosterone and dihydrotestosterone (DHT) and of synthetic anabolic steroids like nandrolone and oxandrolone. The affinity (K_{i}) of enobosarm for the AR is high and was measured as 3.8 nM in one study, or approximately 16.8% of that of DHT. Enobosarm shows enantioselectivity for the AR and has similar but somewhat lower potency than DHT in terms of activating the receptor. In addition to general activation of the AR, enobosarm induces the N/C interaction (the interaction of the amino terminus and carboxyl terminus) of the AR less potently than does DHT, but in any case promotes the N/C interaction concentration-dependently and to the same maximal extent as DHT. The AR is widely expressed in tissues throughout the body, including in the prostate gland, seminal vesicles, genitals, gonads, skin, hair follicles, muscle, bone, heart, adrenal cortex, liver, kidneys, and brain, among others. The effects of SARMs including enobosarm in many of these tissues have yet to be characterized. In any case, enobosarm has been demonstrated to have varying full agonist or partial agonist or antagonist actions in specific tissues, including potent agonistic and anabolic effects in muscle and bone, potent agonistic effects in AR-expressing human breast cancer cell lines like MCF-7 and MDA-MB-231, and partially agonistic or antagonistic effects in the prostate gland, seminal vesicles, and uterus. Enobosarm has additionally been shown to stimulate sexual motivation in female rats similarly to testosterone. Although enobosarm has not been specifically assessed in this area, another structurally unrelated quinolinone SARM, LGD-2226, has shown prosexual effects in male rats comparable to those of the synthetic androgen and anabolic steroid fluoxymesterone as well.

The molecular mechanisms underlying the tissue-selective effects of enobosarm and other SARMs compared to testosterone and other androgens and anabolic steroids remain unknown. However, recruitment of both coactivators and corepressors instead of only coactivators and resultant differing receptor conformations, distinct tissue-specific modulation of signaling pathways mediating genomic and non-genomic effects, and differences in within-tissue ligand metabolism and modulation of ligand potency (i.e., potentiation versus lack thereof), among others, all constitute possible mechanisms. In terms of coregulator recruitment, the ratios of coactivators to corepressors vary in different tissues throughout the body, and it is thought that SARMs may have agonistic effects in tissues with an excess of coactivators relative to corepressors like muscle and bone and may have partially agonistic or antagonistic effects in tissues with an excess of corepressors over coactivators like the prostate. Another mechanism may be that SARMs like enobosarm induce the N/C interaction less readily than AR full agonists like DHT. Induction of the N/C interaction has been associated with the effects of endogenous and exogenous AR agonists, for instance virilization and prostate growth.

In animal studies, enobosarm has shown potent muscle-promoting effects that were similar to those of testosterone and DHT. In one of the first published studies, enobosarm maximally restored prostate weight to 51%, seminal vesicle weight to 98%, and levator ani muscle weight to 136% in castrated male rats relative to gonadally intact control male rats, with an ED_{50} dose for muscle of 0.03 mg/day. For comparison, testosterone propionate was able to maximally stimulate levator ani muscle to 104% and prostate weight to 121%, with ED_{50} doses of 0.15 mg/day and 0.13 mg/day, respectively. Hence, enobosarm was able to stimulate the levator ani muscle to a size greater than that in normal male rats or produced with exogenous testosterone in castrated male rats, but was only capable of partially rescuing prostate gland weight. Additionally, enobosarm fully maintained or restored levator ani weight at doses that did not affect LH or FSH levels in gonadally intact animals (≤0.1 mg/day). As such, it was more potent in stimulating muscle than testosterone at doses that did not affect gonadotropin levels. In gonadally intact male rats, enobosarm significantly increased levator ani muscle weight to 131% of intact controls but significantly decreased the weights of the prostate gland and seminal vesicles, demonstrating an antagonistic or partially agonistic effect in these tissues. In another animal study, enobosarm and DHT increased levator ani weights to similar or slightly different extents in intact male rats, but DHT strongly increased prostate weight while enobosarm reduced prostate weight. Aside from effects in muscle tissue, enobosarm has been assessed and found to completely maintain bone quality and composition in castrated male rats and to partially but not fully prevent bone loss in ovariectomized female rats, indicating potent anabolic effects in bone as well.

In a phase 2 human clinical trial in healthy elderly men and postmenopausal women, enobosarm dose-dependently increased lean body mass (muscle mass) across doses of 0.1, 0.3, 1, and 3 mg/day, with a significant 1.3 kg gain over placebo at 3 mg/day and a non-significant 0.7 kg gain over placebo at 1 mg/day. Similarly, in two phase 3 clinical trials in men and postmenopausal women with muscle wasting due to non-small-cell lung cancer, enobosarm at 3 mg/day significantly increased lean body mass by 0.41 kg and 0.47 kg. However, enobosarm did not successfully increase muscle strength in these phase 3 trials. In any case, it has been suggested that the study designs and physical function outcomes in such trials may have been flawed. The increases in lean body mass that have been seen with employed doses of enobosarm in clinical trials are very modest compared to those produced with supraphysiological doses of testosterone over similar timeframes (e.g., 0.5–1.5 kg with enobosarm versus 5–8 kg with 300–600 mg/week intramuscular testosterone enanthate in healthy young men). The effects of higher doses of enobosarm (9–18 mg/day) on lean body mass and muscle strength are also being evaluated in women with breast cancer. There is some evidence that women may be more sensitive to lean body mass increases with SARMs, specifically GSK-2881078 but potentially also others like enobosarm, than men.

In addition to its mixed agonist–antagonist activity at the AR, enobosarm is likely to also differ from steroidal androgens in its effects due to differences in within-tissue ligand metabolism. The virilizing and androgenic effects of the traditional steroidal androgens like testosterone in skin, hair follicles, and the prostate gland are attributed to high expression of 5α-reductase in these tissues and consequent local conversion and potentiation into more potent androgens. In the case of testosterone, this is via conversion into the 10-fold more potent androgen DHT. Enobosarm is not subject to this local transformation and potentiation, and so is theorized to have greatly reduced effects in these tissues relative to testosterone and certain other steroidal androgens. This is likewise theorized to be the case for non-5α-reductase-potentiated anabolic steroids like nandrolone and oxandrolone, which have high myotrophic–androgenic potency ratios in animals. The lack of 5α-reduction may result in reduced androgenic side effects like scalp hair loss, facial and body hair growth, and prostate growth. On the other hand, although SARMs, like enobosarm, as well as anabolic steroids, may have reduced virilizing effects in skin and hair follicles, this is not necessarily the case for virilization in general. In particular, the muscle-promoting effects of these agents can be considered a masculinizing effect. The potential masculinizing effects of enobosarm and SARMs in general are largely uncharacterized and unknown. Aside from metabolism differences related to 5α-reduction, enobosarm has also shown much greater impact in the liver, specifically on certain aspects of hepatic protein synthesis like reduction of sex hormone-binding globulin (SHBG) production, than even highly supraphysiological doses of parenteral testosterone. This phenomenon has also been seen with other SARMs, such as LGD-4033, as well as with synthetic orally active 17α-alkylated anabolic steroids like stanozolol. It can be attributed to the first pass through the liver with oral administration and to the high oral bioavailability and strong resistance to hepatic metabolism of these agents.

Enobosarm has no estrogenic activity, either intrinsic to itself or via its metabolites. As a result, the drug is not expected to have feminizing effects or risk of gynecomastia (breast development) nor to stimulate estrogen-sensitive breast cancer. SARMs like enobosarm are not ideal agents for androgen replacement therapy as they are not expected to reproduce the full spectrum of effects of testosterone and other androgens, including not only AR-mediated effects but also notably aromatization into estrogen and required physiological estrogenic effects in bone and brain. Enobosarm has been found to be a weak antagonist of the progesterone receptor and hence might have some capacity for antiprogestogenic effects. Aside from its weak interaction with the progesterone receptor, enobosarm is highly selective for the AR and does not bind to other nuclear hormone receptors.

=== Pharmacokinetics ===
==== Absorption ====
Enobosarm is orally bioavailable due to a lack of extensive first-pass metabolism. In rats, the oral bioavailability of enobosarm was found to be 100%. Enobosarm is rapidly absorbed with oral administration and reaches maximal concentrations median 1.0 hours (range 1.0–2.0 hours) following administration. The drug reaches a peak concentration of 56.0 ng/mL (range 53.1–123.0 ng/mL) following a single 3 mg dose and a steady-state peak of 68.1 ng/mL following repeated 3 mg doses. The pharmacokinetics of enobosarm are linear and proportional over a dose range of 1 to 100 mg in single doses in healthy men. The pharmacokinetics of enobosarm are similar in young versus elderly individuals. A concentration–time curve of enobosarm levels following a single oral dose of enobosarm in humans has been published.

==== Distribution ====
Enobosarm is a small-molecule and highly lipophilic compound. Compounds of this type are typically able to diffuse freely through biological membranes such as cell membranes and barriers like the blood–brain barrier. This is in fact essential for the action of nuclear receptor ligands like enobosarm since their biological targets (the androgen receptor in this case) are located intracellularly. One in silico study predicted that, on the basis of its overall physicochemical properties (but not considering active transport), enobosarm would be unlikely to cross the blood–brain barrier and hence would be a peripherally selective drug with reduced or no central nervous system effects. However, in a rat tissue distribution study, enobosarm was found to be concentrated in brain tissues to a similar extent as other target tissues like skeletal muscle, bone, prostate, and seminal vesicles. This is consistent with enobosarm producing centrally mediated effects in humans like suppression of LH and FSH secretion.

Enobosarm does not bind to sex hormone-binding globulin.

==== Metabolism ====
In vitro studies found very minimal metabolism of enobosarm by human cytochrome P450 enzymes. The greatest degree of oxidative metabolite generation occurred with CYP3A4. Upon incubation with human UDP-glucuronosyltransferase (UGT) enzymes, enobosarm glucuronide was generated, with a majority of this inactive metabolite being produced by UGT1A1 and UGT2B7. Enobosarm glucuronide is the primary circulating metabolite of enobosarm.

Coadministration of the strong CYP3A4 inhibitor itraconazole had minimal impact on the pharmacokinetics of enobosarm and enobosarm glucuronide, whereas the strong CYP3A4 inducer rifampin reduced enobosarm peak levels by 23%, elimination half-life by 23%, and area-under-the-curve levels by 43%. Coadministration of the pan-UGT inhibitor probenecid with enobosarm resulted in similar peak levels of enobosarm but the elimination half-life of enobosarm was extended by 78% and area-under-the-curve levels increased by 50%. These data are consistent with the preclinical findings that enobosarm is a substrate of CYP3A4 and UGT enzymes.

The metabolism of enobosarm is similar to that of the closely structurally related drug bicalutamide.

==== Elimination ====
In rats, enobosarm was excreted approximately 70% in feces and 21 to 25% in urine.

Enobosarm has an elimination half-life of approximately 14 to 24 hours in human volunteers. In one pharmacokinetic study, the mean terminal half-life was 22.0 ± 5.8 (SD) hours, with a range of 13.7 to 31.3 hours in different individuals

== Chemistry ==
Enobosarm is a small-molecule (molecular weight = 389.3 g/mol) and highly lipophilic (predicted log P = 2.7–3.3) compound.

Enobosarm and related SARMs like acetothiolutamide, andarine (acetamidoxolutamide; GTx-007; S-4), and GTx-027 were derived from structural modification of the arylpropionamide nonsteroidal antiandrogen bicalutamide. They are nonsteroidal arylpropionamides themselves and are close structural analogues of bicalutamide. Bicalutamide was used to derive acetothiolutamide, andarine was developed from acetothiolutamide, the SARM S-1 was developed from andarine, and finally enobosarm was developed from S-1. Bicalutamide is used clinically as an antiandrogen, but there is some evidence that bicalutamide itself may have some SARM-like properties in certain tissues, for instance in muscle and bone.

Enobosarm (S-22) and andarine (S-4) and their chemical structures have sometimes been confused. The chemical structure of enobosarm was not disclosed until November 2011.

Novel nonsteroidal antiandrogens have been developed from enobosarm with enhanced potency and activity relative to conventional antiandrogens like bicalutamide and enzalutamide.

== History ==
The first SARMs were arylpropionamides derived from the nonsteroidal antiandrogen bicalutamide. They were discovered by James T. Dalton and colleagues at the University of Tennessee and other institutions and were first described in a paper published in 1998. At the time, these AR agonists were referred to as "nonsteroidal androgens", a drug class that had not been previously described. By 1999 however, on the basis of the selective estrogen receptor modulator (SERM)-like mixed agonist–antagonist and tissue-selective activity of these nonsteroidal AR agonists, the term "selective androgen receptor modulator" or "SARM" was introduced and adoption of this name had begun. The arylpropionamide SARM andarine (GTx-007; S-4) was first described in the literature by 2002. In 2003, arylpropionamide AR agonists, including andarine, were first reported to possess SARM-type tissue selectivity in vivo. Enobosarm (GTx-024; S-22), another arylpropionamide SARM, was first identified in 2004 and was first described in the literature in 2005. GTx, a pharmaceutical company founded in Memphis, Tennessee in 1997, licensed the rights to enobosarm from the University of Tennessee Research Foundation and began developing it as a pharmaceutical drug.

A phase 1 clinical trial employing enobosarm had been completed by 2005. By 2007, enobosarm was in a phase 2 trial, and that year GTx signed an exclusive license agreement for its SARM program with Merck & Co. The companies ended the deal in 2010. In August 2011, there was a 12-week double-blind, placebo controlled phase 2 trial that focused on elderly men and postmenopausal women which concluded that enobosarm showed statistically significant improvements in total lean body mass and physical function without apparent adverse effects on hair growth or sebum production. In August 2013, GTx announced that enobosarm had failed in two phase 3 clinical trials to treat wasting in people with lung cancer. The company had invested around $35 million in the development of the drug. The company said at that time that it planned to pursue approval of enobosarm in Europe; the company was also still developing GTx-758, a nonsteroidal estrogen, for castration-resistant prostate cancer. As of 2018, enobosarm was the only SARM to have reached or completed phase 3 clinical trials.

In 2016, GTx began phase 2 trials, to see if enobosarm might be effective to treat stress urinary incontinence in women. In 2018, GTx announced the phase 2 trials on the effectiveness of enobosarm for stress urinary incontinence in women failed to achieve its primary endpoint in the ASTRID Trial. By September 2023, development of enobosarm for stress urinary incontinence had been discontinued. In 2022, the FDA granted fast tract designation to enobosarm in AR+, ER+, HER2- metastatic breast cancer. In January 2024, Veru Inc. submitted an Investigational New Drug application to the FDA of enobosarm for prevention of muscle loss and augmentation of fat loss in combination with glucagon-like peptide-1 (GLP-1) receptor agonists like semaglutide for weight loss. In addition, they announced plans to conduct a phase 2b study of enobosarm at doses of 3 to 6 mg/day for this purpose in sarcopenic obese or overweight elderly individuals receiving GLP-1 receptor agonists.

Enobosarm was developed by GTx, Inc., and is now being developed by Veru, Inc.

== Society and culture ==
=== Names ===
Enobosarm is the generic name of the drug and its International Nonproprietary Name (INN). Ostarine was a tentative brand name of the drug created by GTx, Inc. that did not end up being used for marketing purposes but continues to be used as a synonym for the drug. Enobosarm is also known by the pharmaceutical developmental code names S-22 (synthesis paper), GTx-024 (GTx, Inc.), MK-2866 (Merck), and VERU-024 (Veru, Inc.).

=== Non-medical use ===
Enobosarm and other SARMs are sold as designer drugs by black-market vendors on the Internet. These agents have increasingly become used by the general public as "gym supplements" such as pre-workout or lifestyle drugs, rather than as an aid to performance in athletic or bodybuilding competitions. In one survey, 2.7% of young male gym users in the Netherlands reported using SARMs. In addition, a 2018 analysis of a fatberg from a sewer in central London showed enobosarm to be the most abundant "pharmaceutical drug" detected, and was present at higher concentration than recreational drugs such as MDMA and cocaine. While this isolated result may not be representative of overall levels of use, for enobosarm to be detectable in sewer deposits reflects significant levels of enobosarm use in the area close to where the sample was collected. Doses of enobosarm sold online and used non-medically are often many times higher than those assessed in clinical trials. Aside from enobosarm, the other most commonly used SARMs include vosilasarm (RAD140; "testolone"), LGD-4033 (VK5211; "ligandrol"), and andarine (GTx-007; S-4). Many products sold online that are purported to be enobosarm either contain none or contain other unrelated substances, and doses are also frequently not as labeled. Social media has played an important role in facilitating the widespread non-medical use of SARMs.

=== Doping in sport ===
SARMs including enobosarm may be and have been used by athletes to assist in training and increase physical stamina and fitness, potentially producing effects similar to anabolic steroids. For this reason, SARMs were banned by the World Anti-Doping Agency in January 2008, despite no drugs from this class yet being in clinical use, and blood tests for all known SARMs have been developed. There are a variety of known cases of doping in sports with enobosarm by professional athletes.

==== List of doping cases ====
In May 2017, Dynamic Technical Formulations voluntarily recalled all lots of Tri-Ton, a dietary supplement that the FDA tested and found to contain Enobosarm and andarine.

In October 2018, UFC fighter Sean O'Malley tested positive for Enobosarm and was suspended by the Nevada State Athletic Commission and USADA for six months. O'Malley tested positive again on May 25, 2019 and was suspended for nine months by the same agencies. USADA determined that none of O'Malley's positive tests were consistent with intentional use and he was allowed to compete at UFC 248 as long as he kept his levels below the threshold of 100 ng/ml.

On January 7, 2019, the College National Football Championship was played between University of Alabama and Clemson University. Prior to the College Football National Championship game, three Clemson players who were suspended — Dexter Lawrence, Braden Galloway and Zach Giellaall — tested positive for a substance known as enobosarm. On June 23, 2019 Clemson did not release enobosarm investigation findings, citing privacy law.

In July 2019, National Football League player Taylor Lewan failed a drug test for Enobosarm, which Lewan claimed he ingested accidentally as an unlabeled ingredient in a supplement.

On October 23, 2020, the Union Cycliste Internationale (UCI) announced that the Italian rider Matteo Spreafico has been notified of two adverse analytical findings (AAFs) for Enobosarm in two samples collected during the Giro d'Italia on 15–16 October 2020.

On July 6, 2021, during the 2020 Summer Olympics, Brazil women's national volleyball team player Tandara was temporarily suspended for testing positive for enobosarm. The test was carried out and identified by the Brazilian Doping Control Authority (ABDC).

On August 12, 2021, after the 2020 Summer Olympics, Chijindu "CJ" Ujah, A member of the silver medal-winning British 4×100 relay team was temporarily suspended for testing positive for both enobosarm and S-23. The sample was collected post event by the International Testing Agency (ITA) and confirmed two days later as positive. The case was referred to the anti-doping division of the Court of Arbitration for Sport. Finally in February 2022, Great Britain were stripped of their silver medal. In October 2022, Ujah was suspended for 22 months by the ITA.

In October 2021, two Thoroughbred horses named Arafat and Komunist tested positive for enobosarm after races at Woodbine Racetrack. In a decision of the Alcohol and Gaming Commission of Ontario issued May 30, 2022, the horses were declared unplaced in the races in question, and their trainer Robert Gerl was fined $100,000 (as well as forfeiting prize money) and suspended from racing for 20 years.

In May 2022, National Football League Wide receiver DeAndre Hopkins was suspended six games without pay by the NFL for violating the league's performance-enhancing drug policy. According to Hopkins, he tested positive for enobosarm.

In April 2023, British boxer Amir Khan was banned for two years after an anti-doping test revealed the presence of enobosarm following his fight against Kell Brook in February 2022.

On May 1, 2024, American boxer Ryan Garcia tested positive for the performance-enhancing substance Ostarine the day before and the day of his upset win over Devin Haney last month, per a Voluntary Anti-Doping Association letter sent to all parties Wednesday and obtained by ESPN. The samples were taken prior to the fight, but the results weren't known until later. Garcia's A-sample also screened positive for 19-norandrosterone, but its presence is unconfirmed at this time. Garcia floored Haney three times during the majority decision victory, but that result could possibly be overturned because his B-sample tested positive on May 22, 2024. Garcia's fate now rests in the hands of the New York State Athletic Commission, which will adjudicate any suspensions and financial penalties. Sanctions also include the possibility of his win over Haney being overturned to a no-contest or having it changed to a disqualification. Despite his "B" samples returning positive results, Garcia has maintained his innocence and has cited substance contamination.

== Research ==
Enobosarm is currently under development for the treatment of breast cancer. It was also previously under development for a variety of other potential uses, including treatment of cachexia, Duchenne muscular dystrophy, muscle atrophy or sarcopenia, and stress incontinence. However, development for all other indications has been discontinued.

Enobosarm was assessed for the treatment of muscle wasting in people with lung cancer in two phase 3 clinical trials. The findings of these trials were reported in 2013. Enobosarm significantly improved lean body mass in the trials, but it was not effective in improving muscle strength, as measured by stair climb power. Consequent to these findings, enobosarm did not gain regulatory approval, and development for this use was terminated. Enobosarm had originally been under development for the treatment of sarcopenia (age-related muscle atrophy). However, the FDA requested a cardiovascular safety study be conducted to proceed with phase 3 trials for this indication. The developer of enobosarm refused to conduct this study due to the considerable costs that would be involved. Instead, it opted to trial enobosarm for muscle wasting in cachexia patients, in whom the FDA was more tolerant to cardiovascular side effects and did not require cardiovascular safety evaluation.

Following negative findings for muscle wasting, enobosarm was evaluated for the treatment of stress urinary incontinence in postmenopausal women. It was expected that enobosarm might be effective for this use by strengthening the pelvic floor muscles. Enobosarm reached phase 2 clinical trials for this indication, but development was discontinued due to lack of effectiveness in a phase 2 study.

Subsequently, enobosarm was repurposed again for the treatment of androgen receptor-positive (AR+) estrogen receptor-positive (ER+) breast cancer. As of November 2023, it is in phase 3 clinical trials for the treatment of this type of breast cancer. Increases in lean body mass and muscle strength as a secondary benefit with enobosarm are also being evaluated in these women. These trials are notably employing several-fold higher doses of enobosarm than were assessed in the muscle wasting phase 3 trials (9 mg/day versus 3 mg/day, respectively).

In January 2024, it was announced that enobosarm was being developed for prevention of muscle wasting and augmentation of fat loss in combination with glucagon-like peptide-1 (GLP-1) receptor agonists like semaglutide for weight loss. A phase 2b clinical trial for this indication with 3 to 6 mg/day enobosarm in sarcopenic obese or overweight elderly individuals is being prepared.

According to GTx, the original developer of enobosarm, a total of 25 clinical studies have been carried out on more than 1,700 people involving doses from 1 to 100 mg as of 2020. However, enobosarm has not yet completed clinical development or been approved for any use.

== See also ==
- List of investigational sex-hormonal agents § Androgenics
