= Tissue selectivity =

Disproportionate drug concentrations in differing tissues

Tissue selectivity is a topic in distribution (pharmacology) and property of some drugs. It refers to when a drug occurs in disproportionate concentrations and/or has disproportionate effects in specific tissues relative to other tissues. An example of such drugs are selective estrogen receptor modulators (SERM) like tamoxifen, which show estrogenic effects in some tissues and antiestrogenic effects in other tissues. Another example is peripherally-selective drugs, which do not cross the blood-brain-barrier into the central nervous system and hence are tissue-selective for the periphery.
