= Lean body mass =

Component of body composition

Lean body mass (LBM), sometimes conflated with fat-free mass, is a component of body composition. Fat-free mass (FFM) is calculated by subtracting body fat weight from total body weight: total body weight is lean plus fat. In equations:

LBM = BW − BF

Lean body mass equals body weight minus body fat

LBM + BF = BW

Lean body mass plus body fat equals body weight

LBM differs from FFM in that cellular membranes are included in LBM although this is only a small percent difference in the body's mass (up to 3% in men and 5% in women)

== Overview ==
The percentage of total body mass that is lean is usually not quoted – it would typically be 60–90%. Instead, the body fat percentage, which is the complement, is computed, and is typically 10–40%. The lean body mass (LBM) has been described as an index superior to total body weight for prescribing proper levels of medications and for assessing metabolic disorders, as body fat is less relevant for metabolism. LBW is used by anesthesiologists to dose certain medications. For example, due to the concern of postoperative opioid-induced ventilatory depression in the obese patient, opioids are best based on lean body weight. The induction dose of propofol should also be based on LBW.

== Estimation ==
LBM is usually estimated using mathematical formulas. Several formulas exist, having different utility for different purposes. For example, the Boer formula is method of choice for LBM estimation to calculate the dose given in contrast CT in obese individuals with BMI between 35 and 40.

A nomogram based on height, weight and arm circumference may be used.

=== Boer ===
The Boer formula is:

For men
LBM = (0.407 × W) + (0.267 × H) − 19.2
For women
LBM = (0.252 × W) + (0.473 × H) − 48.3

where W is body weight in kilograms and H is body height in centimeters.

=== Hume ===
The following formula by Hume may be used:

For men
LBM = (0.32810 × W) + (0.33929 × H) − 29.5336

For women
LBM = (0.29569 × W) + (0.41813 × H) − 43.2933

where W is body weight in kilograms and H is body height in centimeters.

== Actual measurement ==
Instead of mathematical estimation the actual value of LBM may be calculated using various technologies such as Dual-energy X-ray absorptiometry (DEXA).

== See also ==
- Body adiposity index
