= Selective androgen receptor modulator =

Class of pharmaceutical drugs

- Drug class
- Enobosarm (ostarine), a nonsteroidal SARM under investigation for potential medical use.

Class identifiers
- Synonyms: Nonsteroidal androgen (although not all SARMs are nonsteroidal)
- Use: Investigational
- Biological target: Androgen receptor
- Chemical class: Mostly nonsteroidal

Legal status
- Legal status: AU: S4 (Prescription only)

Selective androgen receptor modulators (SARMs) are a class of drugs that selectively activate the androgen receptor in specific tissues, promoting muscle and bone growth while having less effect on male reproductive tissues like the prostate gland.

Non-selective steroidal drugs, called anabolic androgenic steroids (AAS), have been used for various medical purposes, but their side effects limit their use. In 1998, researchers discovered a new class of non-steroidal compounds, the SARMs. These compounds selectively stimulate the androgen receptor, offering potent effects on bone and muscle to increase bone density and lean body mass while having minimal impact on reproductive tissues.

SARMs have been investigated in human studies for the treatment of osteoporosis, cachexia (wasting syndrome), benign prostatic hyperplasia, stress urinary incontinence, and breast cancer. As of 2023, there are no SARMs which have been approved by the United States Food and Drug Administration or the European Medicines Agency. Although adverse effects in clinical studies have been infrequent and mild, SARMs can cause elevated liver enzymes, reduction of HDL cholesterol levels, and hypothalamic–pituitary–gonadal axis (HPG axis) suppression, among other side effects.

Since the early twenty-first century, SARMs have been used in doping; they were banned by the World Anti-Doping Agency in 2008. SARMs are readily available on internet-based gray markets and are commonly used recreationally to stimulate muscle growth.

== History ==
=== Steroidal androgens ===
Evolution of anabolic androgenic steroids (top), non-steroidal antiandrogens and SARMs (middle), and SERMs (bottom)

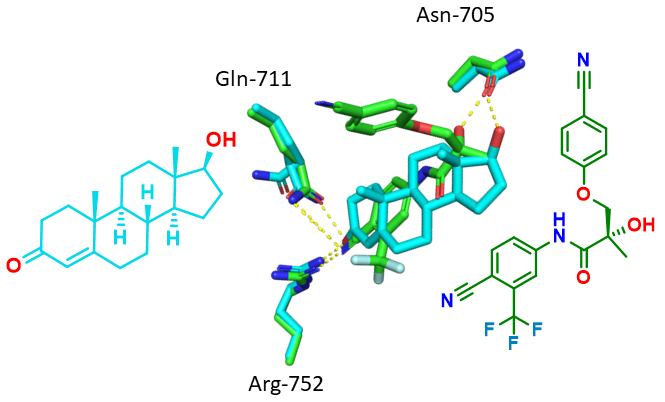
Overlay of the crystallographic structures of testosterone (cyan; PDB: 2AM9) with enobosarm (green; PDB: 3RLJ) complexed with AR. Hydrogen bonds between AR residues Arg-752, Gln-711, Asn-705 and the ligands are depicted as yellow dashes.

Anabolic androgenic steroids (AAS) are used to treat a variety of medical conditions, but their side effects have fueled a search for a new class of drugs, with a better separation between desirable anabolic and undesirable androgenic effects. The first clinically used AAS was testosterone which was discovered in 1935 and first approved for medical use in 1939. AAS including those produced endogenously such as testosterone and dihydrotestosterone (DHT), bind to and activate the androgen receptor (AR) to produce their effects. AAS effects can be separated into androgenic (the development and maintenance of male sexual characteristics) and anabolic (increasing bone density, muscle mass and strength). AAS also affect hematopoiesis, coagulation, metabolism, and cognition. For most medical applications, an AAS with potent anabolic and minimal androgenic and cardiovascular effects would be an advantage.

In the 1930s, 17α-alkylated anabolic steroids were discovered. These have increased metabolic stability and are orally active, but are not tissue selective. These alkylated anabolic steroids still have significant androgenic effects, and are also hepatotoxic. In 1950, nandrolone (19-nortestosterone) was first synthesized, which is sometimes considered a SARM due to greater tissue selectivity than testosterone. In addition, 7α-alkyl substitution of testosterone (for example trestolone) has also been reported to increase its anabolic effects. However, efforts to develop a steroid with anabolic but minimal androgenic effects were not successful.

=== SERMs ===
Interest in nonsteroidal AR mixed agonists/antagonists increased after the therapeutic uses of selective estrogen receptor modulators (SERMs) became evident. The first SERM, tamoxifen, was originally developed as an anti-estrogen contraceptive. However, it was discovered it promoted ovulation in humans by acting as an agonist in ovaries. The drug was then successfully repurposed as a treatment for breast cancer where it was found to act as a full antagonist in breast tissue. Somewhat unexpectedly, it was also discovered that tamoxifen preserves bone density by acting as an agonist in bone resorbing osteoclasts. The clinical success of SERMs stimulated interest in analogous tissue selective drugs that target the AR.

=== Non-steroidal AR antagonists ===
The chemical starting point for AR mixed agonist/antagonists were nonsteroidal AR antiandrogens such as flutamide, nilutamide, bicalutamide. These antagonists work by binding to the AR to prevent androgenic action; this class of chemicals dates to the 1970s. The discovery of arylpropionamides, which share structural similarity with bicalutamide and hydroxyflutamide, suggested a way to make compounds that bind to the AR and produce both anabolic and antiandrogenic effects. Selective androgen receptor modulators (SARMs) were developed out of a desire to maintain the anabolic effects of androgens on muscle and bone, while avoiding side effects on other tissues such as the prostate and cardiovascular system.

=== Non-steroidal SARMs ===
The first non-steroidal SARMs were developed in 1998 independently by two research groups, one at the University of Tennessee that created an arylpropionamide SARM and Ligand Pharmaceuticals that made a SARM with a quinolone core structure. The name was adopted by analogy with SERMs. Other SARMs include tetrahydroquinolines, tricyclics, bridged tricyclics, aniline, diaryl aniline, bicylclic hydantoins, benzimidazole, imidazolopyrazole, indole, and pyrazoline derivatives. SARMs can be agonists, antagonists, or partial agonists of the AR depending on the tissue, which can enable targeting specific medical conditions while minimizing side effects. Those that have advanced to human trials show stronger effects in bone and muscle tissue and weaker effects in the prostate.

Unlike most current forms of testosterone replacement, SARMs are orally bioavailable and largely eliminated via hepatic metabolism and metabolized through amide hydrolysis in the case of arylpropionamides and A-ring nitro reduction of andarine.

=== Proposed treatment of hypogonadism ===
Because of the potentially better side effect profile of SARMs compared to testosterone, SARMs have been proposed for use in the treatment of hypogonadism and for androgen replacement therapy. Phase I and II trials have provided preliminary evidence that the SARMs enobosarm and GSK-2881078 (in elderly men and postmenopausal women), and OPL-88004 (prostate cancer survivors with low levels of testosterone) increase lean body mass and muscle size with little effect on the prostate, supporting the potential of SARMs for use in hormone replacement therapy. However, it has been argued that SARMs are not ideal for use in androgen replacement therapy and could not replace testosterone in this context as they do not reproduce testosterone's full spectrum of effects, including androgenic potentiation via 5α-reduction and aromatization into estrogen. Estrogenic signaling in particular is essential for normal male physiology and health, including for instance maintenance of bone strength.

== Mechanism ==
The mechanism of action of SARMs' tissue-specific effects continues to be debated as of 2020. A number of hypotheses have been advanced. These include the non-activation of SARMs by 5α-reductase, tissue selective expression of androgen receptor coregulators, non-genomic signaling, and tissue selective uptake of SARMs.

=== 5α-Reductase ===
Testosterone is active in non-reproductive tissue without activation. In contrast, tissue selective activation by 5α-reductase to the more active form DHT is required for significant activity in reproductive tissue. The net result is that testosterone and its metabolite together are not tissue selective. SARMs are not substrates of 5α-reductase, hence they are not selectively activated like testosterone in tissues such as prostate. This lack of activation effectively imparts a degree of tissue selectivity to SARMs.

=== Androgen receptor coregulators ===
Tissue selective transcription coregulator expression is another possible contributor to the selectivity of SARMs. Like other type I nuclear receptors, the unliganded androgen receptor (AR) resides in the cytosol complexed with heat shock proteins (HSP). Upon ligand binding, the AR freed from HSPs and translocated into the nucleus where it binds to androgen response elements on DNA to regulate gene expression. AR agonists such as testosterone recruit coactivator proteins to AR that facilitate upregulation of gene expression while antagonists recruit corepressors which down regulate gene expression. Furthermore, the ratio of coactivators to corepressors is known to vary depending on tissue type. Structurally, pure AR agonists stabilize the position of helix-12 (H12) in the ligand binding domain of AR near H3 and H4 to produce a surface cleft that binds to a FxxLF motif contained in coactivators. Conversely, antagonists destabilize the agonist conformation of H12 blocking the binding of the FXXLF coactivator motif while facilitating the binding of the corepressor LXX(I/H)IXXX(I/L) motif found in NCOR1 and SMRT corepressors.

In analogy to SERMs, SARMs are mixed agonists/antagonists displaying agonist androgen receptor activity in bone and muscle and partial agonist or antagonist activity in other tissues such as prostate. Non-selective agonists such as testosterone are able to recruit coactivators when bound to AR but not corepressors and hence are agonists in all tissues. In contrast, SARMs can recruit both coactivators and corepressors by partially destabilizing the agonist conformation of H12. In tissues where coactivators are in excess (as in bone and muscle), SARMs act as agonists. Conversely, in tissues where corepressors are in excess (such as prostate), SARMs act as partial agonists or antagonists.

In vitro testing of the SARMs enobosarm (ostarine) and YK-11 showed that they bound to the AR, but unlike full AR agonists, they blocked interaction between the N-terminus and C-terminus of AR which resulted in a mixed agonist/antagonist mode of action.

=== Non-genomic signaling ===
In addition to the regulation of gene expression by nuclear AR, membrane associated AR is known to have rapid non-genomic effects on cells through signal transduction cascades. Non-genomic effects appear to significantly contribute to the anabolic effects of androgens whereas genomic effects are primarily responsible for the development of male sexual organs. Furthermore, each steroidal androgen or non-steroidal SARM uniquely influences distinct pathways depending on cell type.

=== Tissue distribution ===
Tissue selective uptake into anabolic tissues presents another potential mechanism for SARM tissue selectivity. However autoradiography studies with radiolabeled SARMs show no preferential distribution to anabolic tissues.

== Drug candidates ==
SARM drug candidates
Name	Class	Developer	Investigated for	Highest development stage reached	Structure
Andarine (S-4, GTx-007)	Arylpropionamide	GTx, Oncternal Therapeutics	Cachexia	Phase I (discontinued)	
Arcarine (ORM-11984)	Unknown	Orion Corporation	Benign prostatic hyperplasia, hypogonadism, osteoporosis	Phase I (discontinued)	Structure undisclosed
BMS-564,929 (PS-178990)	Pyrroloimidazole	Bristol-Myers Squibb, Ligand Pharmaceuticals	Andropause, cachexia	Phase I (discontinued)	
DT-200 (GLPG-0492)	Imidazolidine-2,4-dione	ProSkelia, Akashi Therapeutics, Galapagos NV	Muscular dystrophy, cachexia	Phase I	
Enobosarm (ostarine, GTx-024, MK-2866, S-22)	Arylpropionamide	GTx, Veru Healthcare	Breast cancer, cachexia, muscular dystrophy, stress urinary incontinence	Phase III	
GSK-971086	Indole	GlaxoSmithKline	Sarcopenia	Phase I (discontinued)	
GSK-2849466	N-arylhydroxyalkyl	GlaxoSmithKline	Cachexia, heart failure	Phase I (discontinued)	
GSK-2881078	Indole	GlaxoSmithKline	Cachexia	Phase II	
GTx-027	Arylpropionamide	GTx	Breast cancer, stress urinary incontinence	Phase I (discontinued) or preclinical	
LGD-2941 (LGD-122941)	Quinolinone	Ligand Pharmaceuticals	Cachexia, sexual dysfunction, hypogonadism, menopause, osteoporosis	Phase I (discontinued)	
LGD-4033 (VK5211, ligandrol)	Pyrrolidinebenzonitrile	Ligand Pharmaceuticals	Muscle wasting due to hip fracture, cachexia, hypogonadism, osteoporosis	Phase II	
LY305	N-arylhydroxyalkyl	Eli Lilly	Osteoporosis	Phase I	
MK-0773 (PF-05314882)	Steroid	GTx, Merck	Sarcopenia, osteoporosis	Phase II (discontinued)	
MK-3984	Benzylpropionamide	Merck	Sarcopenia	Phase I	
OPK-88004 (LY-2452473, TT-701)	Indole	Eli Lilly, OPKO	Benign prostatic hyperplasia, quality of life in prostate cancer, erectile dysfunction	Phase II	
PF-06260414	Isoquinoline	Pfizer	Cachexia	Phase I (discontinued)	
Vosilasarm (RAD140, EP0062, testolone)	Phenyloxadiazole	Ellipsis	Breast cancer, osteoporosis, sarcopenia	Phase I/II	
YK-11	Steroid	Toho University	Muscle wasting	Preclinical	

Certain anabolic steroids, like trestolone, dimethandrolone undecanoate, and 11β-methyl-19-nortestosterone dodecylcarbonate, have also sometimes been classified as SARMs.

== Possible therapeutic applications ==
Due to their tissue selectivity, SARMs have the potential to treat a wide variety of conditions, including debilitating diseases. They have been investigated in human studies for the treatment of osteoporosis, cachexia, benign prostatic hyperplasia, stress urinary incontinence, prostate cancer, and breast cancer and have also been considered for the treatment of Alzheimer's disease, Duchenne muscular dystrophy, hypogonadism and as a male contraceptive. As of 2023, there are no SARMs which have been approved for therapeutic use by the United States Food and Drug Administration or the European Medicines Agency.

Most SARMs have been tested in vitro or on rodents, while limited clinical trials in humans have been carried out. Initial research focused on muscle wasting. Enobosarm (ostarine) is the most well-studied SARM; according to its manufacturer, GTx Incorporated, 25 studies have been carried out on more than 1,700 humans as of 2020 involving doses from 1 to 18 mg each day. As of 2020, there is little research distinguishing different SARMs from each other. Much of the research on SARMs has been conducted by corporations and has not been made publicly available.

=== Benign prostatic hyperplasia ===
In rat models of benign prostatic hyperplasia (BPH), a condition where the prostate is enlarged in the absence of prostate cancer, SARMs reduced the weight of the prostate. OPK-88004 advanced to a phase II trial in humans, but it was terminated due to difficulty in measuring prostate size, the trial's primary endpoint.

=== Cancer ===
SARMs may help treat AR and estrogen receptor (ER) positive breast cancer, which comprise the majority of breast cancers. AAS were historically used successfully to treat AR positive breast cancer, but were phased out after the development of antiestrogen therapies, due to androgenic side effects and concerns about aromatization to estrogen (which does not occur with SARMs). Although a trial on AR positive triple negative breast cancer (which is ER-) was ended early due to lack of efficacy, enobosarm showed benefits in some patients with ER+, AR+ breast cancer in a phase II study. In patients with more than 40 percent AR positivity as determined by immunohistochemistry, the clinical benefit rate (CBR) was 80 percent and the objective response rate (ORR) was 48 percent—which was considered promising given that the patients had advanced disease and had been heavily pretreated. In 2022, the FDA granted fast track designation to enobosarm for AR+, ER+, HER2- metastatic breast cancer. Other SARMs such as vosilasarm have reached clinical trials in breast cancer patients.

=== Bone and muscle wasting ===
As of 2020, there are no drugs approved to treat muscle wasting in people with chronic diseases, and there is therefore an unmet need for anabolic drugs with few side effects. One aspect hindering drug approval for treatments for cachexia and sarcopenia (two types of muscle wasting) is disagreement in what outcomes would demonstrate the efficacy of a drug. Several clinical trials have found that SARMs improve lean mass in humans, but it is not clear whether strength and physical function are also improved. After promising results in a phase II trial, a phase III trial of enobosarm was proven to increase lean body mass but did not show significant improvement in function. It and other drugs have been refused regulatory approval due to a lack of evidence that they increased physical performance; preventing decline in functionality was not considered an acceptable endpoint by the Food and Drug Administration. It is not known how SARMs interact with dietary protein intake and resistance training in people with muscle wasting.

Phase II trials of enobosarm for stress urinary incontinence—considered promising, given that the levator ani muscle in the pelvic floor has a high androgen receptor density—did not meet their endpoint and were abandoned.

Unlike other treatments for osteoporosis, which work by decreasing bone loss, SARMs have shown potential to promote growth in bone tissue. LY305 showed promising results in a phase I trial in humans.

== Side effects ==
In contrast to AAS and testosterone replacement, which have many side effects that have curtailed their medical use, SARMs are well tolerated and have mild and infrequent adverse events in randomized controlled trials. SARMs are sometimes claimed to be non-virilizing (non-masculinizing). However, SARMs are largely uncharacterized clinically in terms of potential virilizing effects. In addition, SARMs cannot be aromatized to estrogen, thus causing no estrogenic side effects, for instance gynecomastia.

SARM use can cause elevated liver enzymes and reduction in HDL cholesterol. Transdermal administration via a skin patch may reduce these effects. Several case reports have associated SARMs with hepatocellular drug-induced liver injury when used recreationally, it is not known if the risk is significant for medical use. Whether SARMs increase the risk of cardiovascular events is unknown. SARMs have less effect on blood lipid profiles than testosterone replacement; it is not known whether androgen-induced HDL reductions increase cardiovascular risk; and SARMs increase insulin sensitivity and lower triglycerides.

Although they cause less suppression of the hypothalamic–pituitary–gonadal axis (HPG axis) than testosterone, studies have found that gonadotropins, free and total testosterone, and SHBG can be reduced in a compound- and dose-dependent fashion in men from SARM usage. Typically, SHBG is reduced along with total testosterone and total cholesterol, while hematocrit is increased. Most studies have found that follicle-stimulating hormone (FSH), luteinizing hormone (LH), prostate-specific antigen, estradiol, and DHT levels are not altered. Of SARMs that have been investigated, enobosarm is one of the least suppressive of gonadotropins, even in doses much higher than used in clinical trials. How the HPG axis is affected in women using SARMs is unknown. SARMs' effect in suppressing the gonadotropins FSH and LH is what makes SARMs potentially useful as a male contraceptive.

== Non-medical use ==
Outside of pharmaceutical research, SARMs are a gray market substance produced by small laboratories and often marketed as a research chemical supposedly not for human consumption. Marketing SARMs for human consumption is illegal in some jurisdictions and has led to criminal convictions in the United States and the largest-ever fine levied under Australia's Therapeutic Goods Act 1989. Although SARMs are readily available for purchase on the internet, one study found that a majority of products advertised as SARMs online were mislabeled. Anecdotes and guides on usage can also be found online and on social media. Some compounds are commonly marketed for recreational use as SARMs despite having a different mechanism of action. These substances include ibutamoren (MK-677), which increases secretion of growth hormone; GW501516 (cardarine), an exercise mimetic that works as an agonist of the PPARβ/δ; and SR9009 (Stenabolic), an agonist of the Rev-Erb, which plays a role in circadian rhythm.

SARMs are used by bodybuilders and competitive athletes due to their anabolic and lack of androgenic effects, particularly in the United States, Europe, and other western countries. Some individuals using SARMs recreationally combine multiple SARMs or take a SARM along with other compounds, although there is no research on combining SARMs. The doses used often exceed those from clinical trials; nevertheless, the fat-free mass gained from SARMs is generally lower than what is obtained with moderate doses of testosterone derivatives. According to one study of SARM users, more than 90 percent were satisfied with their usage and 64 percent would take SARMs again even though a majority experienced adverse effects.

SARMs were banned by the World Anti-Doping Agency (WADA) in 2008. SARMs can be detected in urine and hair after consumption. WADA reported its first adverse analytical finding for SARMs in 2010 and the number of positive tests has increased since then; the most commonly detected SARMs are enobosarm (ostarine) and LGD-4033 (ligandrol). Athletes competing in the NFL, NBA, UFC, NCAA, and the Olympics have tested positive. There is limited evidence on how SARMs affect athletic performance.

== Terminology ==
SARMs are sometimes also referred to as "nonsteroidal androgens", although not all SARMs are nonsteroidal in structure and steroidal SARMs also exist. In 1999, the term "selective androgen receptor modulator" or "SARM" was introduced, as the mixed agonist–antagonist and tissue-selective activity of these nonsteroidal androgen receptor agonists had similarities with selective estrogen receptor modulators (SERMs). Despite its widespread use, the term "selective androgen receptor modulator" has been criticized by some authors, like David Handelsman, who argue that it is a misleading pharmaceutical marketing term rather than an accurate pharmacological description. He has also critiqued notions that SARMs isolate anabolic effects from androgenic or virilizing effects, as has been previously claimed in the case of anabolic steroids.
