= LGD-4033 =

Chemical compound

Clinical data
- Other names: LGD4033; VK5211; VK-5211; Ligandrol; Anabolicum
- Routes of administration: By mouth
- ATC code: None

Legal status
- Legal status: US: Investigational New Drug

Pharmacokinetic data
- Elimination half-life: 24–36 hours

Identifiers
- IUPAC name: 4-[(2R)-2-[(1R)-2,2,2-trifluoro-1-hydroxyethyl]pyrrolidin-1-yl]-2-(trifluoromethyl)benzonitrile
- CAS Number: 1165910-22-4
- PubChem CID: 44137686
- DrugBank: DB13934
- ChemSpider: 29364487
- UNII: 1EJT54415A
- ChEMBL: ChEMBL5170587
- CompTox Dashboard (EPA): DTXSID10657620

Chemical and physical data
- Formula: C_{14}H_{12}F_{6}N_{2}O
- Molar mass: 338.253 g·mol^{−1}
- 3D model (JSmol): Interactive image
- SMILES: FC([C@H](O)[C@H]1CCCN1C2=CC(=C(C#N)C=C2)C(F)(F)F)(F)F
- InChI: InChI=1S/C14H12F6N2O/c15-13(16,17)10-6-9(4-3-8(10)7-21)22-5-1-2-11(22)12(23)14(18,19)20/h3-4,6,11-12,23H,1-2,5H2/t11-,12-/m1/s1; Key:OPSIVAKKLQRWKC-VXGBXAGGSA-N

LGD-4033, also known by the developmental code name VK5211 and by the black-market name Ligandrol, is a selective androgen receptor modulator (SARM) which is under development for the treatment of muscle atrophy in people with hip fracture. It was also under development for the treatment of cachexia, hypogonadism, and osteoporosis, but development for these indications was discontinued. LGD-4033 has been reported to dose-dependently improve lean body mass and muscle strength in preliminary clinical trials, but is still being developed and has not been approved for medical use. The drug is taken by mouth.

Known possible side effects of LGD-4033 include headache, dry mouth, adverse lipid changes like decreased high-density lipoprotein (HDL) cholesterol levels, changes in sex hormone concentrations like decreased testosterone levels, elevated liver enzymes, and liver toxicity. The potential of LGD-4033 and other SARMs for producing masculinization is largely uncharacterized and hence is unknown. LGD-4033 is a nonsteroidal SARM, acting as an agonist of the androgen receptor (AR), the biological target of androgens and anabolic steroids like testosterone and dihydrotestosterone (DHT). However, it shows dissociation of effect between tissues in preclinical studies, with agonistic and anabolic effects in muscle and bone and partially agonistic or antagonistic effects in the prostate gland.

LGD-4033 was first described in 2010. It is less clinically studied than other SARMs like enobosarm, with only a few small clinical trials having been conducted and reported. LGD-4033 has not yet completed clinical development or been approved for any use. As of 2023, it is in phase 2 clinical trials for the treatment of hip fracture and muscle atrophy. LGD-4033 was developed by Ligand Pharmaceuticals, and is now being developed by Viking Therapeutics.

Aside from its development as a potential pharmaceutical drug, LGD-4033 is on the World Anti-Doping Agency list of prohibited substances and is sold for physique- and performance-enhancing purposes by black-market Internet suppliers. LGD-4033 is often used in these contexts at doses greatly exceeding those evaluated in clinical trials, with unknown effectiveness and safety. Many products sold online that are purported to be LGD-4033 either contain none or contain other unrelated substances. Social media has played an important role in facilitating the widespread non-medical use of SARMs.

== Medical uses ==
LGD-4033 is not approved for any medical use and is not available as a licensed pharmaceutical drug as of 2023.

== Side effects ==
Side effects of LGD-4033 may include headache and dry mouth. LGD-4033 has been found to dose-dependently decrease levels of total testosterone, free testosterone, follicle-stimulating hormone (FSH), sex hormone-binding globulin (SHBG), HDL cholesterol, and triglycerides, while not affecting levels of luteinizing hormone (LH), total cholesterol, LDL cholesterol, or prostate-specific antigen (PSA). Due to the decreased ratio of HDL cholesterol to LDL cholesterol, LGD-4033 could theoretically increase the risk of heart attack and stroke.

Elevated liver enzymes, such as increased levels of aspartate aminotransferase (AST) or alanine aminotransferase (ALT), have not been reported with LGD-4033 in the few conducted clinical trials thus far. However, multiple case reports of hepatotoxicity with LGD-4033 in the setting of non-medical use have been published.

LGD-4033 and other SARMs are largely uncharacterized in terms of their potential for masculinizing effects, for example in women. In addition, the effects and safety of high doses of LGD-4033 and other SARMs, which are often used in non-medical contexts, are unknown. Anecdotal reports of masculinization with black-market SARMs in women exist in online forums.

The United States Food and Drug Administration (FDA) claims that "liver toxicity, adverse effects on blood lipid levels, and a potential to increase the risk of heart attack and stroke" are among the potential adverse health effects of SARMs including LGD-4033.

== Overdose ==
LGD-4033 has been assessed in clinical trials at single doses ranging from 0.1 to 22 mg and at repeated doses ranging from 0.1 to 2 mg/day for 3 to 12 weeks. The drug sold via black-market Internet suppliers and used non-medically is often taken at much higher doses than those used in repeated-dose clinical trials (e.g., 5–10 mg/day), with unknown adverse effects and risks.

== Pharmacology ==
=== Pharmacodynamics ===
LGD-4033 is a selective androgen receptor modulator (SARM), or a tissue-selective mixed agonist or partial agonist of the androgen receptor (AR). This receptor is the biological target of endogenous androgens like testosterone and dihydrotestosterone (DHT) and of synthetic anabolic steroids like nandrolone and oxandrolone. LGD-4033 shows high affinity and selectivity for the AR, with an affinity (K_{i}) value of 0.9 nM. It did not meaningfully interact with the progesterone receptor, glucocorticoid receptor, or mineralocorticoid receptor (all K_{i} > 4,000 nM), whereas the estrogen receptor α was not assessed. In terms of in vitro transcriptional activity at the AR, the efficacy (E_{max}) of LGD-4033 was 132% to 133% and its EC_{50} was 3.6 to 4.4 nM. The AR is widely expressed in tissues throughout the body, including in the prostate gland, seminal vesicles, genitals, gonads, skin, hair follicles, muscle, bone, heart, adrenal cortex, liver, kidneys, and brain, among others. LGD-4033 has been found to have varying full agonist and partial agonist AR-mediated effects in different tissues, including potent agonistic and anabolic activity in muscle and bone and weaker partial agonist activity in the prostate gland and sebaceous glands.

LGD-4033 has shown robust selectivity for stimulation of the levator ani muscle relative to stimulation of the prostate in rats. At the highest assessed dose in castrated male rats, levator ani weight was increased to around 140% of that of gonadally intact controls, whereas prostate weight was only increased to around 45% of that of intact controls. The tissue selectivity of LGD-4033 was independent of local tissue drug concentration, suggesting that its selectivity was intrinsic. The muscle-stimulating effects of LGD-4033 have also been confirmed in humans in preliminary clinical trials. The data also allow comparison between different SARMs and other AR agonists. In a phase 1 clinical trial in 76 healthy young men, 1 mg/day LGD-4033 increased lean body mass by 1.2 kg after 3 weeks of treatment. For comparison, enobosarm, another SARM, increased lean body mass by 1.3 kg at a dose of 3 mg/day after 12 weeks in healthy elderly men and postmenopausal women. It was concluded that the employed dose of LGD-4033 produced similar increases in lean body mass compared to enobosarm despite a substantially shorter treatment period. In a phase 2 clinical trial in 108 women and men with hip fracture, LGD-4033 increased lean body mass by 4.8% at 0.5 mg/day, 7.2% at 1 mg/day, and 9.1% at 2 mg/day after 12 weeks of treatment. For comparison, lean body mass with enobosarm 3 mg/day after the same time period of 12 weeks increased by about 0.30% at 0.1 mg/day, 0.40% at 0.3 mg/day, 1.2% at 1 mg/day, and 3.1% at 3 mg/day, with only the latter change achieving statistical significance. Relative to SARMs, supraphysiological doses of testosterone (300–600 mg/week intramuscular testosterone enanthate) over similar timeframes, like 20 weeks, have been found to result in lean body mass gains of 5 to 8 kg in healthy young men.

In addition to selectivity for muscle and bone over the prostate gland, LGD-4033 has also been stated by Ligand Pharmaceuticals researchers to have reduced strength in the sebaceous glands. Reduced activity in stimulating sebaceous gland formation, to about 30 to 50% of that produced by DHT at doses with similar anabolic potency in rats, has also been reported for certain other SARMs, like the steroidal agents TFM-4AS-1 and MK-0773. In addition, enobosarm and MK-0773 have been reported to limitedly stimulate the sebaceous glands in small short-term clinical studies in women.

=== Pharmacokinetics ===
LGD-4033 showed linear or dose-proportional pharmacokinetics across doses of 0.1 to 1 mg/day over 21 days of administration. Levels of LGD-4033 were 3-fold higher at day 21 compared to day 1, indicating significant accumulation with repeated administration. The mean area-under-curve levels of LGD-4033 on day 21 were 19 ng•day/mL at 0.1 mg/day, 85 ng•day/mL at 0.3 mg/day, and 238 ng•day/mL at 1 mg/day. The elimination half-life of LGD-4033 is 24 to 36 hours. Pharmacokinetic studies of LGD-4033 for purposes of doping detection have also been conducted.

== Chemistry ==
LGD-4033 is a nonsteroidal SARM with a pyrrolidinyl-benzonitrile core structure and is also referred to as a quinoline or quinolinone SARM. LG121071 (LGD-121071), a tricyclic quinoline, was the predecessor compound of LGD-4033. The chemical structure of LGD-4033 had not been disclosed as late as 2013. LGD-4033 has sometimes been confused with other structurally related Ligand Pharmaceuticals SARMs including LGD-2226, LGD-2941, and LGD-3303, but is a different compound from these agents.

LGD-4033 is a small-molecule (molecular weight = 338.3 g/mol) and highly lipophilic (predicted log P = 3.6–3.7) compound.

== History ==
The predecessor of LGD-4033, LG121071 (LGD-121071), was discovered by Ligand Pharmaceuticals and was first described in the literature in January 1999. It was the first orally active nonsteroidal androgen receptor agonist to be discovered. LG121071 is a tricyclic quinoline derivative, and is structurally distinct from arylpropionamide SARMs like andarine and enobosarm (ostarine). LGD-2226, a bicyclic quinoline SARM, was subsequently developed by Ligand Pharmaceuticals and TAP Pharmaceuticals in 2001. Other quinoline SARMs, like LGD-2941 and LGD-3303, were also subsequently developed by Ligand Pharmaceuticals prior to the development of LGD-4033.

LGD-4033 was developed by Ligand Pharmaceuticals and was first described in the literature in 2010. On the basis of a favorable preclinical profile, phase 1 clinical trials of LGD-4033 began in 2009. The results of a single-dose phase 1 clinical trial were published as a conference abstract in 2010 and the findings of a multi-dose phase 1 trial were published as a journal article in 2013. A third phase 1 trial was also conducted. By 2012, a phase 2 trial of LGD-4033 for the treatment of muscle wasting related to cancer cachexia, acute rehabilitation (e.g., hip fracture), and acute illness was being prepared by Ligand Pharmaceuticals. On 22 May 2014, Viking Therapeutics licensed the developmental rights of LGD-4033 from Ligand Pharmaceuticals and intended to advance the compound into mid-to-late-stage clinical trials. The phase 2 study of LGD-4033 for muscle wasting was finally initiated in November 2016 and was completed with results reported in 2017 and 2018. As of March 2023, LGD-4033 (VK5211) continues to be under development by Viking Therapeutics and continues to be in phase 2 clinical trials for treatment of muscle atrophy and hip fracture.

== Society and culture ==
=== Regulatory information ===
In the United States, LGD-4033 is an Investigational New Drug and is not approved for any medical use.

=== Non-medical use ===
Though not an approved drug, LGD-4033 (Ligandrol) has been sold on the black market as a designer drug in countries where it is classified as an illegal substance. Along with enobosarm (ostarine; GTx-024, S-22), andarine (GTx-007; S-4), and vosilasarm (RAD140; "testolone"), LGD-4033 is one of the most popular and common non-medically-used SARMs. Many products sold online that are purported to be LGD-4033 either contain none or contain other unrelated substances, and doses are also frequently not as labeled. Social media has played an important role in facilitating the widespread non-medical use of SARMs.

On 23 October 2017, a nutritional supplement company in Missouri called Infantry Labs was warned by the FDA that the distribution of two of its products violated the Federal Food, Drug, and Cosmetic Act. One of the substances was LGD-4033. The company advertised as benefits of the LGD-4033: "increases in lean body mass and decrease in body fat" and "increases in strength, well being, as well as healing possibilities". The company mislabeled as "dietary supplements" what should have been "new drugs" or "prescription drugs" and were instructed to document the steps they would take in order to cease the violation.

Also on 23 October 2017, the FDA sent a warning letter to a New Jersey company called Panther Sports Nutrition. The company's marketing approach for the product was similar to that of the Infantry Labs case, and the product was advertised as a "mass builder" and "physique enhancing agent".

=== Doping in sport ===
LGD-4033 is on the World Anti-Doping Association (WADA) list of prohibited drugs and has been found in drug testing samples of some athletes. Since at least June 2015, LGD-4033 has been available via the internet. In that month, German scientists proposed a new test to detect its metabolites present in human urine, and suggested an expansion of the WADA regime. LGD-4033 has been found in WADA samples and in racehorses as well.

==== List of doping cases ====
On 15 March 2024 cyclist Christos Volikakis was informed of an Adverse Analytical Finding on a re-analysis of a sample from the 2016 Rio Olympics. The athlete has since requested an analysis of the B sample.

In 2015, the quarterback of the Florida Gators, Will Grier, was suspended for testing positive for LGD-4033, a claim that the University of Florida denies.

In 2017, Joakim Noah was banned for twenty games by the NBA for testing positive for LGD-4033.

In 2019, Australian swimmer Shayna Jack tested positive for LGD-4033. She denies knowingly taking the substance.

In August 2019, it came to light that Canadian sprint canoeist Laurence Vincent Lapointe tested positive for LGD-4033; the athlete denies knowingly taking a forbidden substance that resulted in her suspension from competition. The athlete remarked that the National Team Training Centre purchased nutritional supplements for its athletes and denied buying or taking nutritional supplements on her own. On 27 January 2020 she was cleared of all charges. The substance was found in her results because of an exchange of bodily fluids with her boyfriend, who took LGD-4033.

In January 2020, Chilean ATP tennis singles competitor Nicolás Jarry tested positive for both LGD-4033 and stanozolol. He protested at the time that the multi-vitamins from Brazil that he took on the advice of an unnamed doctor were contaminated.

On 3 September 2022, sprinter Nzubechi Grace Nwokocha was provisionally suspended for the use of banned substances enobosarm and LGD-4033 by the Athletics Integrity Unit (AIU).

On 23 January 2024, Tristan Thompson was suspended for 25 games by the NBA for testing positive for ibutamoren and LGD-4033.

On 12 March 2024, curler Briane Harris was provisionally suspended for up to four years after testing positive for LGD-4033. She denies this after being tested by doping control officers on Jan. 24 and notified of her positive test on Feb. 15. A second sample, called the B sample, also confirmed the positive test. She appealed the ban to the Court of Arbitration for Sport (CAS), arguing she was unknowingly exposed to it through bodily contact. CAS ruled that "Harris has established that she bears No Fault or Negligence for the anti-doping rule violation. No period of Ineligibility is imposed."

== Research ==
Oral administration of LGD-4033 to cynomolgus monkeys at daily doses varying from 0 to 75 mg/kg over 13 weeks demonstrated significant body weight gain in both males and females. After 48 days, the 75 mg/kg dose testing was halted due to toxicity concerns, but this did not negatively impact development of the drug as this dose is significantly higher than the doses being utilized in a phase 2 clinical trial.

Two phase 1 clinical trials of LGD-4033 have been conducted and reported. The first was a single-dose study published as a conference abstract in 2010 and the second was a multi-dose study published as a journal article in 2013. The multi-dose phase 1 trial published in 2013 reported that LGD-4033 dose-dependently improved lean body mass and muscle strength in 76 healthy young men over 21 days. It was generally well-tolerated in this study, with no significant adverse effects reported.

A phase 2 clinical trial, initiated on 3 November 2016, consisted of 108 women and men recovering from hip fracture surgery. The randomized study participants received either placebo or varying doses of LGD-4033 over a period of 12 weeks, with improved lean body mass as the primary endpoint. Other endpoints included satisfactory results in terms of quality of life, safety, and pharmacokinetics. This study was completed and results reported in 2017 and 2018. In the trial, LGD-4033 dose-dependently improved lean body mass and muscle strength and was reported to be safe and well-tolerated. Placebo-adjusted lean body mass was increased by 4.8% at 0.5 mg/day, 7.2% at 1 mg/day, and 9.1% at 2 mg/day after 12 weeks.

As of 2023, LGD-4033 has been less studied than other SARMs like enobosarm, with only three small phase 1 clinical trials and one phase 2 trial, or a total of four clinical studies, having been conducted and reported.
