= LG121071 =

Chemical compound

Clinical data
- Other names: LG-121071; LGD-121071

Identifiers
- IUPAC name: 6-Ethyl-4-(trifluoromethyl)-1H,2H,6H,7H,8H,9H-pyrido[3,2-g]quinolin-2-one
- CAS Number: 179897-70-2
- PubChem CID: 9839132
- ChemSpider: 8014851
- UNII: 242F29CP76
- ChEMBL: ChEMBL390728
- CompTox Dashboard (EPA): DTXSID501045799

Chemical and physical data
- Formula: C_{15}H_{15}F_{3}N_{2}O
- Molar mass: 296.293 g·mol^{−1}
- 3D model (JSmol): Interactive image
- SMILES: CCC1CCNC2=C1C=C3C(=CC(=O)NC3=C2)C(F)(F)F
- InChI: InChI=1S/C15H15F3N2O/c1-2-8-3-4-19-12-7-13-10(5-9(8)12)11(15(16,17)18)6-14(21)20-13/h5-8,19H,2-4H2,1H3,(H,20,21); Key:SZPPQFARTYXRKU-UHFFFAOYSA-N

LG121071 (or LGD-121071) is a selective androgen receptor modulator (SARM) developed by Ligand Pharmaceuticals that was first described in 1999 and was the first orally active nonsteroidal androgen to be discovered. It is a tricyclic quinolone derivative, structurally distinct from other nonsteroidal AR agonists like andarine and enobosarm (ostarine). The drug acts as a high-affinity full agonist of the androgen receptor (AR) (K_{i} = 17 nM), with a potency and efficacy that is said to be equivalent to that of dihydrotestosterone (DHT). Unlike testosterone, but similarly to DHT, LG121071 and other nonsteroidal androgens cannot be potentiated by 5α-reductase in androgenic tissues (nor aromatized into estrogenic metabolites), and for this reason, show tissue-selective androgenic effects. In accordance, they are said to possess full anabolic activity with reduced androgenic activity, similarly to anabolic-androgenic steroids.

The in vitro metabolism of LG121071 has been characterized in anticipation of its possible use as a doping agent.

== See also ==
- Acetothiolutamide
- LG-120907
- LGD-2226
- LGD-3303
- S-40503
