= Ivor Royston =

Researcher

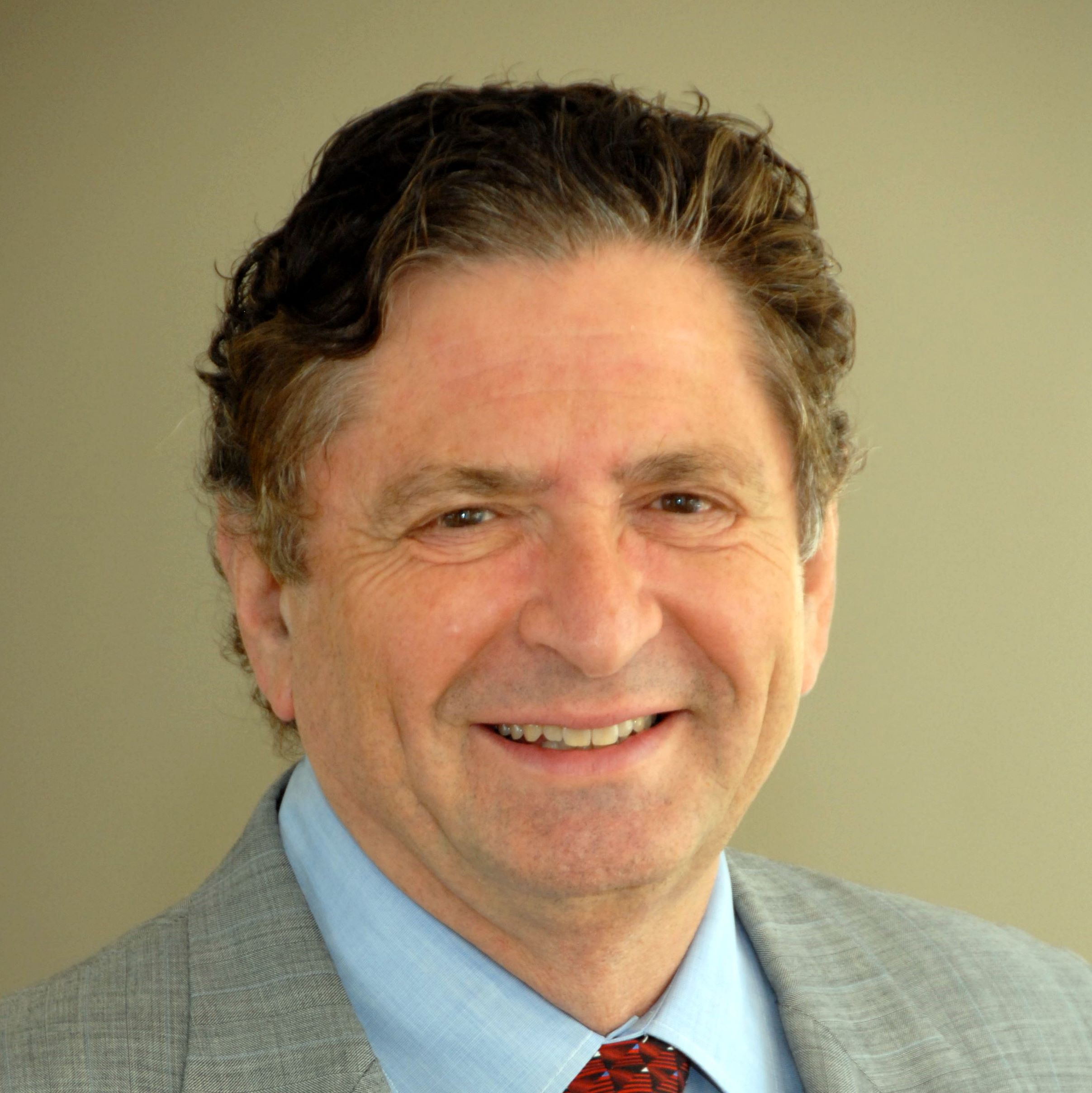
- Born: Retford, England
- Scientific career
- Fields: Oncologist, researcher, scientist, entrepreneur and venture capitalist

Ivor Royston is an American oncologist, researcher, scientist, entrepreneur and venture capitalist, recognized for his efforts to develop treatments for multiple disease targets and to fund biotechnology companies with promising science, technology or medicines. He speaks regularly at healthcare conferences and symposia throughout the United States, Europe and Asia.

One of Royston's most significant achievements may be his successful efforts to partner academic medical research with industry to take potential treatments more quickly from the benchtop to the bedside.

After co-founding the first biotechnology company in San Diego, California, he and his associates went on to form or invest in dozens of other biotechs, laying the foundation of the region's thriving biotech cluster, one of the three largest in the United States. As a venture capitalist, Royston invests in start-up companies that have promising technologies for treating and potentially curing diseases, including various forms of cancer.

Born in Retford, England, Royston emigrated to the United States with his family in 1954 at age 9, and later, as a 14-year-old, he declared that he would devote his life to curing cancer. Unlike many future scientists, his passion also extended to commerce. This early interest in business manifested itself in a Washington, D.C., high-school investment club of 16 boys—dubbed the Chessmen—that he founded with friends. He also bought and operated an ice cream truck to earn money for college.

These divergent interests—medicine and business—would one day catapult Royston beyond his peers, transforming San Diego's economy while improving the health and lives of tens of thousands of patients along the way.

== Accomplishments ==
In 1978 Royston, then an assistant professor at the University of California-San Diego, bridged a chasm between academia and the marketplace, triggering a paradigm shift that forever changed San Diego's medical research community and led to the region's establishment as a leading international biotech clusters.

Royston's reasoning was that private enterprise clearly provided the fastest way to get new, life-saving medicines from the research bench top to the patient's bedside. While serving as a researcher and a practicing physician at UCSD, Royston felt the frustration at the long process required to deliver innovative treatments to patients. That frustration fueled his decisive action to work towards eliminating the disconnect between research and clinical application by founding Hybritech with fellow scientist Howard Birndorf in 1978.

The idea behind Hybritech was to harness monoclonal antibodies to quickly diagnose and treat diseases. Financier Brook Byers, of Kleiner Perkins Caufield & Byers, realized the importance of the science and recognized the longer-term value of the budding entrepreneurs' passion, energy and commitment. His firm provided the $300,000 start-up funding, and Hybritech's first product, antibodies for the hepatitis B virus, reached the research market in 1980. The PSA test developed later by the company for the early diagnosis of prostate cancer has benefited countless victims of this deadly disease and set the stage for new blood tests for the early detection of cancer. Hybritech went public in 1981 and, five years later, pharmaceutical giant Eli Lilly and Company paid $480 million for the company.

Tina Nova, one of the senior scientists at Hybritech, reflects that “It was like “Animal House”' meets “The Waltons”

Royston went on to co-found IDEC Pharmaceuticals (later Biogen Idec) in 1985. Other co-founders included Howard Birndorf, Richard Miller and Brook Byers. He also co-founded the San Diego Regional Cancer Center, of which he was president and CEO 1990 until 2000. Renamed the Sidney Kimmel Cancer Center in 1995, it filed for chapter 11 bankruptcy in 2009.

More than 50 San Diego companies trace their lineage directly to Hybritech, its founders and early employees. Among those are IDEC, San Diego's biggest biotech success story, with a billion dollars in sales for its lymphoma treatment Rituxan. Others include Amylin, Cancervax, Gen-Probe, Ligand Pharmaceuticals and Nanogen.

In addition to Hybritech, Royston has been directly involved in the founding or funding of many biotech companies as an entrepreneur and venture capitalist. These companies include: Applied Molecular Evolution, Avalon Pharmaceuticals, Combichem (acquired by Dupont), Corixa, Dynavax Technologies Corporation, Genesys Therapeutics (merged with Somatix and acquired by Cell Genesys), Genquest (acquired by Corixa), HenaQuest, IDEC Pharmaceuticals (merged with Biogen), LigoCyte, Micromet (formerly CancerVax), Morphotek (Acquired by Eisai Corporation), Sequana Therapeutics (merged with Arris to form AXYS and acquired by Celera Genomics), Syndax, Targegen, Triangle Pharmaceuticals (acquired by Gilead) and Variagenics (merged with Hyseq Pharmaceuticals to form Nuvelo).

Royston is impassioned. Some people are steady keeled, but he's not like that. Royston is always passionately on, wheeling and dealing, or he's exhausted. Those are his only two states.

— Daniel Gold

== Career milestones ==
- As a producer of the Broadway musical Jersey Boys, Royston won a 2006 Tony Award for best musical.
- In April 2017, he was appointed as the President and the CEO of Viracta Therapeutics, a San Diego–based anti-cancer biotech company. He helped establish the company with technology retrieved from San Diego's HemaQuest Pharmaceuticals which was originally developed in Douglas Faller's lab at Boston University.

== Philanthropy ==
In 1987, Royston and his wife established the Ivor and Colette Carson Royston Advised Fund at the San Diego Foundation to support a variety of healthcare and cultural organizations. The Sidney Kimmel Cancer Center, San Diego Opera, La Jolla Playhouse, the Museum of Contemporary Art, the Jewish Community Center and Congregation Beth Israel are among those organizations to benefit from the Roystons' generosity.

In 2002, they presented the Ivor and Colette Royston Research Program Award to the Johns Hopkins University School of Medicine.

== Personal ==
Royston is married to Colette and they have two children.

== Awards ==
- Entrepreneur Hall of Fame, CONNECT, 2006
- Tony Award. The American Theatre Wing, 2006
- Visionary Award, LEAD San Diego, 2008
- Biotechnology Heritage Award, BIO & Science History Institute, 2020
