= C21H28O =

The molecular formula C_{21}H_{28}O (molar mass: 296.454 g/mol) may refer to:

- Itruvone
- S42 (SARM)
