= LG-120907 =

Nonsteroidal antiandrogen of the quinoline group

Clinical data
- Other names: 1,2,3,4-Tetrahydro-2,2-dimethyl-6-trifluoromethyl-8-pyridono[5,6-g]quinoline
- Drug class: Nonsteroidal antiandrogen

Identifiers
- IUPAC name: 2,2-Dimethyl-6-(trifluoromethyl)-1,9-dihydropyrido[3,2-g]quinolin-8-one
- CAS Number: 179897-43-9
- PubChem CID: 10851308
- ChemSpider: 9026602
- ChEMBL: ChEMBL350877

Chemical and physical data
- Formula: C_{15}H_{13}F_{3}N_{2}O
- Molar mass: 294.277 g·mol^{−1}
- 3D model (JSmol): Interactive image
- SMILES: CC1(C=CC2=C(N1)C=C3C(=C2)C(=CC(=O)N3)C(F)(F)F)C
- InChI: InChI=1S/C15H13F3N2O/c1-14(2)4-3-8-5-9-10(15(16,17)18)6-13(21)19-12(9)7-11(8)20-14/h3-7,20H,1-2H3,(H,19,21); Key:MMLSXRYBGYGQEP-UHFFFAOYSA-N

LG-120907 is a nonsteroidal antiandrogen (NSAA) of the quinoline group which was developed by Ligand Pharmaceuticals along with selective androgen receptor modulators (SARMs) like LG-121071 and was never marketed. The drug is a high-affinity antagonist of the androgen receptor (AR) with a K_{i} value of 26 nM and has been found to inhibit growth of the ventral prostate and seminal vesicles in male rats without increasing circulating levels of luteinizing hormone or testosterone. However, this tissue selectivity has not been assessed in humans. LG-120907 is orally active and shows greater oral potency than the arylpropionamide NSAA flutamide.

The 7-fluoro derivative of LG-120907, LG-105, is also a potent NSAA, and appears to possess greater potency in comparison. Conversely, the 6-ethyl, 8-didesmethyl analogue of LG-120907, LG-121071, is a SARM with potent androgenic activity equivalent to that of dihydrotestosterone (DHT).
