= Pegylated interferon =

Drug class

Pegylated interferon (PEG-IFN) is a class of medication that includes three different drugs as of 2012:

- Peginterferon alfa-2a
- Peginterferon alfa-2b
- Peginterferon beta-1a

In these formulations, Polyethylene glycol (PEG) is added to make interferon last longer in the body. They are used to treat both hepatitis B, hepatitis C and multiple sclerosis.

Pegylated interferon is contraindicated in patients with hyperbilirubinaemia.
