= Lemelson =

Lemelson may refer to:

- Jerome H. Lemelson (1923–1997), American inventor and founder of the Lemelson Foundation
  - the Lemelson–MIT Prize, which he endowed in 1994
- Emmanuel Lemelson (born 1976), Greek Orthodox priest and hedge fund manager
  - Lemelson Capital Management, the investment management firm which he founded
