= Sparsentan =

Medication

Clinical data
- Trade names: Filspari
- Other names: RE-021, PS433540
- AHFS/Drugs.com: Monograph
- MedlinePlus: a623018
- License data: US DailyMed: Sparsentan
- Pregnancy category: Contraindicated
- Routes of administration: By mouth
- ATC code: C09XX01 (WHO)

Legal status
- Legal status: US: ℞-only; EU: Rx-only

Identifiers
- CAS Number: 254740-64-2
- PubChem CID: 10257882
- DrugBank: DB12548
- UNII: 9242RO5URM
- KEGG: D11776
- ChEBI: CHEBI:229526
- ECHA InfoCard: 100.275.317

Chemical and physical data
- 3D model (JSmol): Interactive image
- SMILES: CCCCC1=NC2(CCCC2)C(=O)N1CC1=CC=C(C(COCC)=C1)C1=CC=CC=C1S(=O)(=O)NC1=NOC(C)=C1C
- InChI: InChI=1S/C32H40N4O5S/c1-5-7-14-29-33-32(17-10-11-18-32)31(37)36(29)20-24-15-16-26(25(19-24)21-40-6-2)27-12-8-9-13-28(27)42(38,39)35-30-22(3)23(4)41-34-30/h8-9,12-13,15-16,19H,5-7,10-11,14,17-18,20-21H2,1-4H3,(H,34,35); Key:WRFHGDPIDHPWIQ-UHFFFAOYSA-N

Sparsentan, sold under the brand name Filspari, is a medication used for the treatment of primary immunoglobulin A nephropathy and focal segmental glomerulosclerosis. Sparsentan is an endothelin and angiotensin II receptor antagonist. It is taken by mouth.

The most common side effects include swelling of the extremities, low blood pressure, dizziness, high blood potassium, anemia, injury to the kidney, and increased liver enzymes in the blood.

It was approved for medical use in the United States in February 2023. The US Food and Drug Administration (FDA) considers it to be a first-in-class medication. The drug was approved for the treatment of focal segmental glomerulosclerosis in April 2026.

== Medical uses ==
Sparsentan is indicated to reduce proteinuria in people with primary immunoglobulin A nephropathy.

== Adverse effects ==
The most common side effects include swelling of the extremities, low blood pressure, dizziness, high blood potassium, anemia, injury to the kidney, and increased liver enzymes in the blood.

Other potential risks of sparsentan include low blood pressure, injury to the kidney, high potassium in the blood, and fluid retention. Sparsentan can cause changes in liver tests. Some medicines that are like sparsentan can cause liver failure.

Sparsentan can cause serious birth defects if taken during pregnancy and should not be started in someone who is pregnant.

== History ==
Sparsentan was discovered by Pharmacopeia, Inc. and developed as PS433540 as their lead compound in a new class of agents called dual acting receptor antagonists (DARA). PS433540 was originally developed as a treatment for hypertension and diabetic nephropathy. After Pharmacopeia was acquired by Ligand Pharmaceuticals, the DARA programs was licensed to Retrophin and developed as RES-021 in 2012. Retrophin would then be rebranded as Travere Therapeutics.

Sparsentan was evaluated in a randomized, double-blind, active-controlled, clinical trial (PROTECT) in participants with IgA nephropathy. Participants with IgA nephropathy and protein in the urine were randomly assigned to receive either sparsentan or irbesartan once daily. The primary endpoint for accelerated approval was the mean change in urine protein at week 36 compared to baseline.

The US Food and Drug Administration (FDA) granted accelerated approved to sparsentan based on evidence from a clinical trial (PROTECT) of participants with IgA nephropathy. The trial was conducted at 156 sites in 18 countries in North America, Europe, and Asia-Pacific. The same trial was used to assess both efficacy and safety. The efficacy analyses were based on an interim analysis of 281 participants (141 on sparsentan, 140 on irbesartan) who reached week 36 in the trial. The safety analyses were based on 404 participants (202 each on sparsentan and irbesartan) who received at least one dose of either drug.

== Society and culture ==
=== Legal status ===
Sparsentan was approved in the US under accelerated approval based on reduction of proteinuria. In September 2024, the US FDA converted the conditional approval in the kidney disease IgA nephropathy (IgAN) into a full approval based on positive long-term confirmatory results from the PROTECT Study demonstrating that sparsentan significantly slowed kidney function decline over two years compared to irbesartan.

In February 2024, the Committee for Medicinal Products for Human Use of the European Medicines Agency adopted a positive opinion recommending the granting of a conditional marketing authorization for the medicinal product Filspari, intended for the treatment of adults with primary immunoglobulin A nephropathy (IgAN). The applicant for this medicinal product is Vifor France. Sparsentan was approved for medical use in the European Union in April 2024.
