= Tim Harris (biochemist) =

British scientist

- Born: May 11, 1950 (age 76)
- Education: University of Birmingham, UK
- Known for: Translational Medicine
- Scientific career
- Fields: Biotechnology
- Workplaces: Repertoire Immune Medicines

Tim Harris (born 11 May 1950) is a molecular biologist/biochemist who is a science and business leader who has led laboratory work, scientists and companies in a range of research activities in the Biotechnology Industry since 1978.

== Early life and education ==
Harris was brought up in the Chiltern Hills west of London and is the son of Dr. RJC Harris who was a chemist and cancer research scientist and who was at ICRF and later ran the Microbiological Research Establishment at Porton Down in the 1970s. Harris was educated at Uppingham school and obtained a BSc in Biochemistry and a PhD in Molecular Virology with Prof Peter Wildy at the University of Birmingham. He was awarded an honorary doctorate for his work in Biotechnology from his alma mater in 2010.

== Work ==
Harris was EVP of Research & Development at Bioverativ until it was acquired by Sanofi in 2018. From 2011 to 2016, He worked as SVP Translational Medicine at Biogen. He was CEO of SGX Pharmaceuticals from 1999 to 2006, VP R&D at Sequana Therapeutics (1993-1999), and Director of the Advanced Technology Program and CTO at SAIC-Frederick, Inc. (2007-2011). He began his scientific career working in the UK on animal viruses at the Animal Virus Research Institute at Pirbright and spent one year (1976-1977) at SUNY Stony Brook working with Dr. E Wimmer on polio virus. Dr. Harris was one of the first molecular biologists to be employed at the UK Biotech company Celltech (now UCB Pharma) (1981-1989). Dr Harris was Director of Biotechnology at Glaxo Group Research (Now GSK) (1989-1993). He is presently a Venture Partner at SV Health Investors. Dr. Harris has founded several biotechnology companies including Caraway Therapeutics, a lysophagy company (2016) bought by Merck in 2023 and Catamaran Bio (2019), a company developing NK cell therapeutics. He is currently on the board of directors of Phenome TX in Edinburgh and Chairman of the SAB of Catamaran Bio. He was also a visiting professor at Columbia University in New York. Dr Harris has published over 100 scientific papers and several reviews. Some of the most important include identifying genes involved in ALS using exome sequencing and finding risk factors associated with NMO. Most recently he has published on the importance of T cells in SARS CoV-2 infection. He has written a book on the history of the biotech industry called ' In pursuit of unicorns: A journey through 50 years of biotechnology' which will be published by Cold Spring Harbor Laboratory Press in early 2024.
