= Tom Byers =

Tom Byers may refer to:

- Tom Byers (professor), professor at Stanford University
- Tom Byers (runner) (born 1955), distance runner and businessman
