= LG-2527 =

Chemical compound

Clinical data
- Drug class: Progestin; Progestogen

LG-2527 is a nonsteroidal progestin which was under development by Ligand Pharmaceuticals and Wyeth for the treatment of menopausal symptoms and breast cancer, but was never marketed. It reached the preclinical stage of development prior to the discontinuation of its development in early 2001.
