= Lancaster Girls' Grammar School =

Location
- Regent Street; Lancaster, Lancashire, LA1 1SF; England; 54.04573°N 2.80332°W

Information
- Type: Grammar school; Academy
- Established: 1907
- Department for Education URN: 136381 Tables
- Ofsted: Reports
- Head teacher: Chris Beard
- Gender: Girls
- Age: 11 to 18
- Enrolment: 1005
- Houses: Aalborg(J), Perpignan(K), Rendsburg(L), Lublin(M)
- Colours: ,
- Publication: LGGS Chronicle (annual)
- Website: http://www.lggs.org.uk/

Lancaster Girls' Grammar School (LGGS) is a selective state grammar school with academy status for girls on Regent Street in Lancaster, England. It was established in 1907.

== About LGGS ==
LGGS gained Technology College status in 1995, and Language College status in 2007.

== Centenary ==
The school passed its centenary year in 2007 bringing a few changes along with it. The school logo was updated and the uniform changed along with a new hall added to the main part of the school building.

== House system ==
Lancaster Girls' Grammar school has a House system as girls are sorted into these house in first year, and remain affiliated with them for the rest of their school career. The Houses are named after the twin towns of Lancaster:

- Aalborg represented by the colour blue
- Perpignan represented by the colour green
- Rendsburg represented by the colour red
- Lublin represented by the colour yellow

There are inter-house competitions throughout the year, including the Performing Arts Festival, Sports Day and the Music Festival.

== History ==
The school was founded in 1907 as the Storey Institute. It was made in an effort to boost girls' education and was a fee-paying school until after World War Two. The school closed for a short period during the war and some students would sleep in the building although it was not considered a boarding school.

== Notable former pupils ==
- Norine Braithwaite, 800m and 1500m runner, in the 1970 and 1974 Commonwealth Games
- Prof Noreen Murray FRS CBE, molecular geneticist
