= Brook Byers =

American businessman

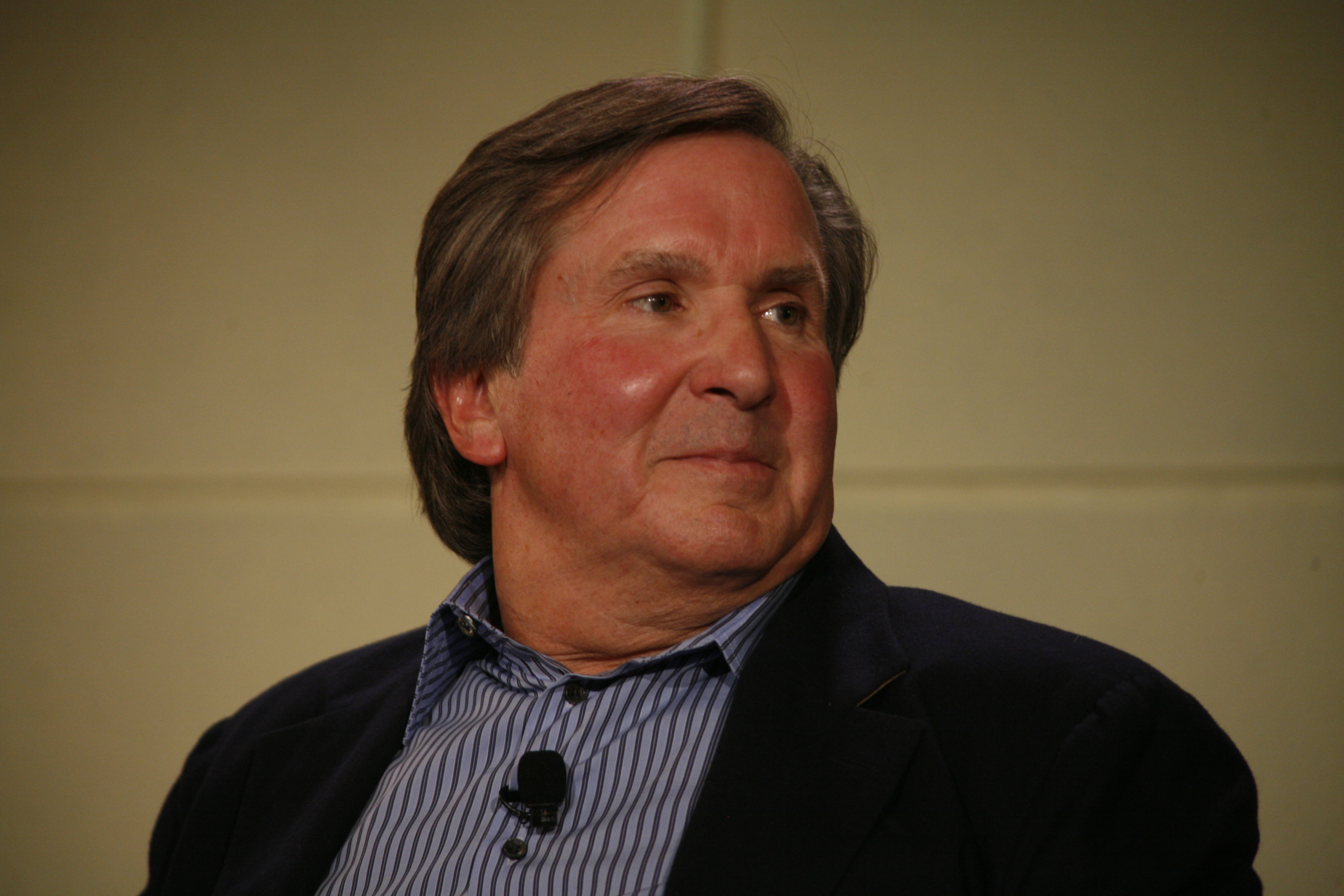
- Born: August 2, 1945 (age 81); Belleville, IL
- Education: Georgia Tech; Stanford University
- Occupation: Venture capitalist

Brook Byers (born August 2, 1945, Belleville, IL (Scott Air Force Base)) is a cofounder of Kleiner Perkins and a philanthropist.

== Early life and education ==
Raised in Atlanta, Georgia, Byers earned a bachelor's degree in electrical engineering in 1968 from Georgia Tech and an MBA from Stanford University.

== Career ==
Brook cofounded Kleiner Perkins Caufield and Byers (KPCB) in 1977. KPCB was one of the first venture capital firms and remains a top firm having invested in early financing rounds of companies including Google, Amazon, Genentech and Netscape. Brook led early investments in Tandem Computing, Electronic Arts and Genentech. He has been closely involved with more than fifty new technology based ventures, over half of which have already become public companies. He formed the first Life Sciences practice group in the venture capital profession in 1984 and led KPCB to become a top tier venture capital firm in the medical, healthcare, and biotechnology sectors. KPCB has invested in and helped build over 110 Life Sciences companies which have already developed hundreds of products to treat major underserved medical needs for millions of patients.

=== Activity in biotechnology ===
Byers was the founding president and then chairman, of four biotechnology companies which were incubated in KPCB's offices and went on to become public companies with an aggregate market value over $8 Billion. He is often featured on the Forbes Midas list and is currently on the board of directors of ten companies; CardioDX, Crescendo Bioscience, Inc., Genomic Health Incorporated, Five Prime Therapeutics, OptiMedica, HX Diagnostics, Pacific Biosciences, Inc., Tethys, Veracyte, Inc., and XDx, Inc. Previously, he served on the board of directors of Idec Pharmaceuticals (chairman), Athena Neurosciences (chairman), Signal Pharmaceuticals, Arris Pharmaceuticals, Pharmacopeia, Ligand Pharmaceuticals (chairman), Hybritech (chairman), Genprobe, Nanogen, and others. These companies have pioneered the medical use of molecular biology, monoclonal antibodies, personalized medicine, molecular diagnostics and genomics.

== Healthcare and science support ==
Byers has supported biomedical research and fundraising at the University of California, San Francisco (UCSF). He has been active with the UCSF Foundation since 1987 and served as co-chair of the Campaign for UCSF from 1998 to 2005, which raised $1.4 billion. In 2007, he received the UCSF Medal, the university's highest award, which replaced the granting of honorary degrees.

In 2015, Byers and his family established the Byers Family Distinguished Professorship at UCSF. UCSF said the professorship recognized Byers' support for research and entrepreneurship at the university, including support for QB3 and Mission Bay Capital.

Byers and his family also founded the Byers Award in Basic Science through UCSF's Sandler Program for Breakthrough Biomedical Research. The award supports mid-career faculty members pursuing high-risk research ideas.

In 2008, he was elected a Fellow of the American Academy of Arts and Sciences. In 2009, he received the Lifetime Achievement Award from the National Venture Capital Association.

Byers was president and a director of the Western Association of Venture Capitalists and is a contributing author of the book Guide to Venture Capital. He was formerly a director of the Entrepreneurs Foundation, the California Healthcare Institute, the Asian Art Museum of San Francisco, the Stanford University Graduate School of Business Advisory Council, UCSF's That Man May See Vision Research Foundation (chairman), and the Georgia Tech Advisory Board, and was a founder of TechNet.

== Personal life ==
Byers' sons are venture capitals and entrepreneurs Blake Byers and Chad Byers. Byers is the brother of Stanford University Professor Tom Byers.
