= Emmanuel Lemelson =

American businessman, hedge fund manager and priest

The Reverend Emmanuel Lemelson
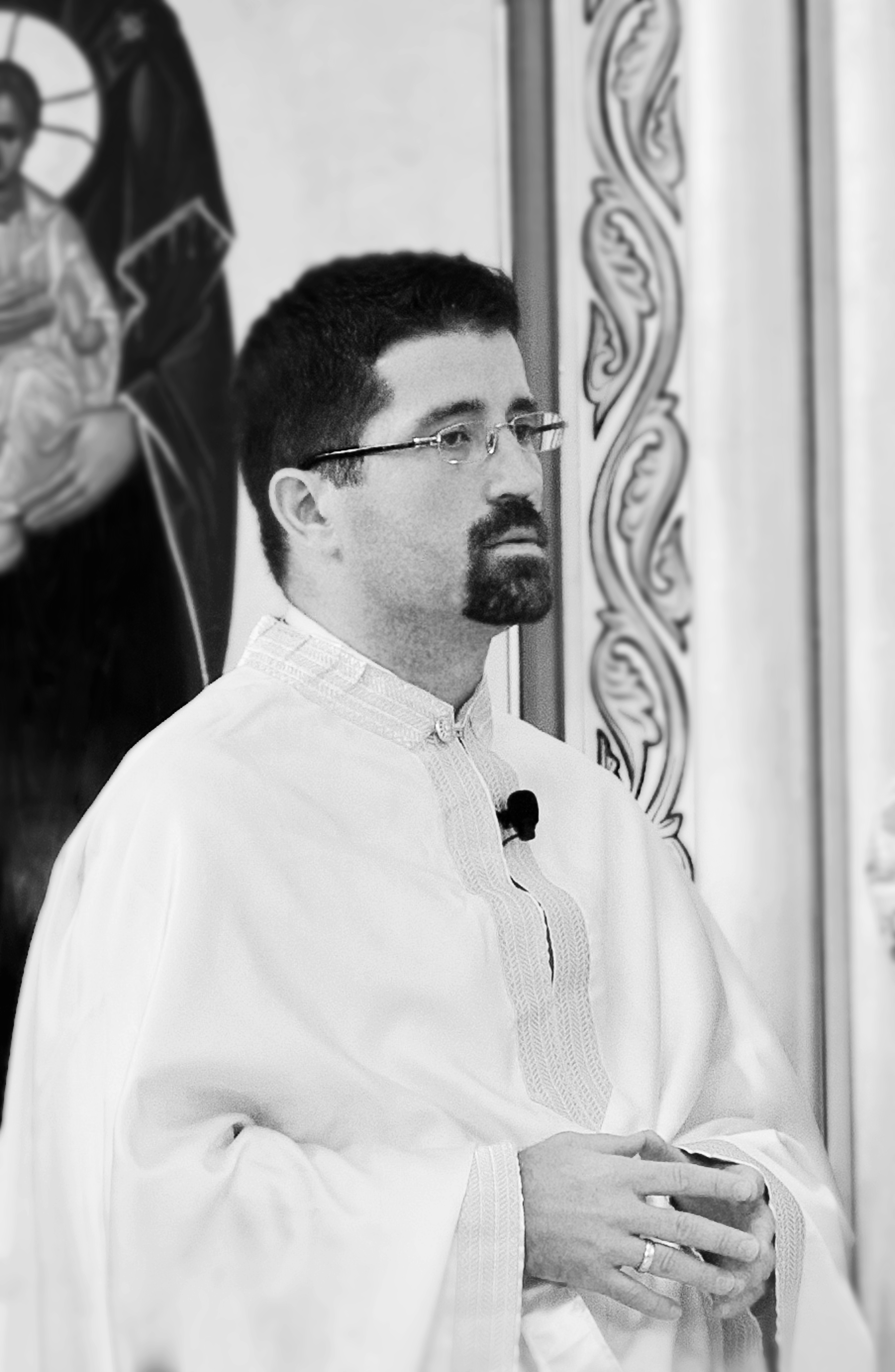
- Photograph of Emmanuel Lemelson

Orders
- Ordination: July 23, 2011 by Metropolitan Elpidophoros

Personal details
- Born: Phoenix, Arizona, United States
- Occupation: Greek Orthodox priest, social commentator, and hedge fund manager
- Education: Seattle University (BA); Hellenic College Holy Cross (M.Div.)

Emmanuel Lemelson (born Gregory Manoli Lemelson) is an American-born Greek Orthodox priest, social commentator and hedge fund manager.

Between 1999 and 2010, he ran the internet company Amvona. In 2011, Lemelson was ordained a Greek Orthodox priest. In 2012, he founded Lemelson Capital Management, which runs The Amvona Fund, a hedge fund based on Christian ethics. In September 2018, Lemelson was sued by the U.S. Securities and Exchange Commission for various infractions involving a short sale. A federal jury returned a mixed verdict resulting in a fine and 5-year injunction barring Lemelson from further securities violations.

== Early life and education ==
Gregory Manoli Lemelson was born in Phoenix, Arizona to a Jewish father and Christian mother. Following high school, he attended Seattle University, graduating with a Bachelor of Arts in Theology and Religious Studies in 1999. He then attended Hellenic College Holy Cross Greek Orthodox School of Theology in Brookline, Massachusetts, where he received a M.Div. in 2003.

While a 17-year-old undergraduate at Seattle University, Lemelson met Robert Spitzer, a Jesuit priest and philosopher. In interviews, Lemelson has indicated that the encounter was a significant event in his religious life.

== Early career ==
By 1994, while an undergraduate student at Seattle University, Lemelson launched a retail photography business, and in 1999 he founded the website Amvona (a name derived from the Greek word for "pulpit") from his dorm room at Hellenic College. The company, which sold photography accessories, grew quickly, generating around $40 million in revenue.

Writing in the local Massachusetts paper The Sun Chronicle in 2009, journalist Rick Foster quotes Lemelson as stating that his business focuses on cash flow rather than debt and that "Amvona owes nothing to venture capitalists." Despite economic challenges, Lemelson launched Amvona Trails, a platform combining social networking and e-commerce and believed recessions provide an opportunity for innovation.

Between 1999 and 2010, Amvona sold more than a million photo accessories to 300,000 customers, and was one of the top ten most visited online photo retail websites. The company also registered several patents, including proprietary software to connect its customers through user profiles, product reviews, exit data and online tracking software. Similar technology was later used by other websites to track user activities.

In 2010, Amvona discontinued its e-commerce business. There was no official explanation, however journalist Filipe R. Costa speculated it was due to increased competition from Chinese companies offering cheap photography equipment online, and Lemelson's business philosophy of not taking on massive debt for the possibility of future growth.

== Religious activity ==
Lemelson was ordained as a Greek Orthodox deacon on July 23, 2011, and, the following day, as a priest by Metropolitan Elpidophoros of Bursa. He was granted the ecclesiastical name Emmanuel and was assigned to the Albanian Orthodox Diocese of America at the Holy Trinity Albanian Orthodox parish in South Boston. In June 2013, he was assigned to the Holy Metropolis of Switzerland, a jurisdiction of the Ecumenical Patriarchate.

In November 2014, Lemelson was a member of the Orthodox Church's delegation for a two-day meeting between Ecumenical Patriarch Bartholomew I and Pope Francis in Istanbul. He has said that as a young man he fostered a vision that Catholics and Orthodox Christians would soon be reunited, and he has stated that more progress towards reconciliation has been made under these two leaders than had taken place in nearly a millennium, since the East–West Schism. Lemelson also argued that the timing was "critical" since, as he claimed, "Christians are facing unprecedented persecution in our modern era."

At a presidential candidate campaign rally for Donald Trump held in Keene, New Hampshire on September 30, 2015, Lemelson offered the invocation and spoke at the rally, condemning the abortion practices of Planned Parenthood. He also gave a personal blessing to Trump.

In October 2016 Lemelson called for the removal of the chancellor of the Greek Orthodox Metropolis of Boston following a clergy sex-abuse scandal. He said the incident was preventable and there were serious deficiencies in the protocols used for the oversight of clergy.

In 2023, Lemelson faced legal opposition from his neighbors, including Fritz Burkard, a Swiss billionaire heir to a chemicals fortune, and American billionaire Dan Hirschfeld, founder of retailer Buckle, over his construction of an Orthodox chapel and other developments in Stowe, Vermont. The Burkhard and Hirshfeld legal challenges were unsuccessful.

== Social commentary and media appearances ==
Lemelson has been profiled or appeared as a commentator on Benzinga, CBS Radio Boston, Fox News and on Russia's NTV. In a 2015 Fox Business video interview, Lemelson criticized the Federal Reserve for keeping interest rates artificially low and contributing to economic inequality, and in a June 2016 op-ed for The National Interest, he advocated strengthening of US immigration policy, which he claimed would oppose Islamic extremism. In an interview with NTV he stated that identity politics contradicts Christian teaching.

In October 2015, Lemelson was profiled in a 4-minute video produced by The Wall Street Journal.

He is the creator of the Fr. Emmanuel Lemelson Podcast, which examines "Government, Wall Street, and culture from an Orthodox Christian perspective." In a January 2025 interview with Russia's NTV, he asserted that Elon Musk is "driven by demons", a claim later echoed by the television channel, which also aired scenes from the podcast.

== Hedge fund manager ==
In 2012, Lemelson founded Lemelson Capital Management, LLC, the sole sponsor and general partner of The Amvona Fund, L.P. and Spruce Peak Fund, LP that focus on deep value and special situations.

=== The Amvona Fund, LP ===
In 2014, he shorted the stock of World Wrestling Entertainment, questioning the value of the company's brand. and stating that he believed the company had made material misrepresentations about both its performance and operating model. When the share price subsequently fell, Lemelson went long the stock and called for new leadership or a sale of the company.

In late April, 2014 Lemelson announced he was building a stake in the semiconductor and LED equipment maker Kulicke & Soffa Industries (NASDAQ: KLIC), saying the company was "absurdly" undervalued. In a letter to the company's CEO Lemelson said he had amassed a stake of nearly 1% and planned to continue buying. Following his commentary, shares rose nearly 10% on triple the normal trading volume.

In June 2014, he shorted the stock of Ligand Pharmaceuticals, criticizing its business practices in a 56-page report alleging fraud and insolvency and focusing on the drug Promacta and its relationship to Viking Therapeutics. He also wrote letters to Congress regarding the alleged abuses. The report allegedly caused a $500 million drop in the company's market capitalization and, after covering his short position in October 2014, a profit of $1.3 million to Lemelson.

Lemelson's activities led the Amvona Fund to be ranked in three months during 2013–14 among the world's top performing hedge funds, and by mid 2015 the company reported a net return of 150 percent since its launch.

In October 2015, The Wall Street Journal published an article about Lemelson that included a claim that he boasted of his ability to "crash" stocks and quoted him as saying "My whole life I always knew things before they happened. I guess it's just a gift from God". Lemelson later published a response to the story, calling it a "directory of fallacies", and outlined what he described as 14 major factual errors and omissions, but did not deny the quote regarding prescience. Dow Jones (the owner of The Wall Street Journal) stated that they stood by their story.

=== Spruce Peak Fund, LP ===
In 2021, Lemelson set up his second fund, Spruce Peak, LP. From March 1, 2021 to December 31, 2023 it has reported an annualized return of 16.92%, compared to the S&P 500 TR's 9.96% performance over the same time period.

=== Sued by the SEC ===
In 2016 Bloomberg published an article, citing anonymous sources, stating that the U.S. Securities and Exchange Commission (SEC) was examining whether Lemelson had spread false rumours about stocks. Lemelson called the article "irresponsible and libelous" and later sued Bloomberg, but his complaint was dismissed.

In 2018 Lemelson was sued by the SEC for irregularities over his 2014 Ligand short sale. The SEC alleged that Lemelson distributed false reports to websites such as PR Newswire, Street Insider, USA Today and worked to have comments "critical of him removed from news releases, including his statements on his alleged bias and lack of expertise". In November 2021 a federal jury returned a mixed verdict finding Lemelson liable for violating SEC Rule 10b-5 by making untrue statements, but not liable for the more serious accusation under the same rule, of scheming to defraud Ligand investors. In March 2022, U.S. District Judge Patti B. Saris fined Lemelson $160,000 as a civil penalty and issued a prohibitory five year injunction. Lemelson's appeal to the 1st U.S. Circuit Court of Appeals against this ruling was rejected in January 2023, and his subsequent petition to the Supreme Court of the United States for review was declined in December 2023.

Lemelson's civil motion for the SEC to pay his $1.7 million attorney's fees was denied in July 2024 by the United States District Court in Massachusetts. In December 2024, a coalition including the organization Advancing American Freedom and 27 other amici in Lemelson v. SEC, began a challenge to the denial.

On May 27, 2025, the First Circuit vacated and remanded the district court's denial of attorneys' fees and costs, finding the lower court erred.

== Personal life ==
As of 2014 Lemelson was married to Theodora Anjeza Lemelson and lived in Southborough, Massachusetts. As of 2015, he had four children.
