= S42 (selective androgen receptor modulator) =

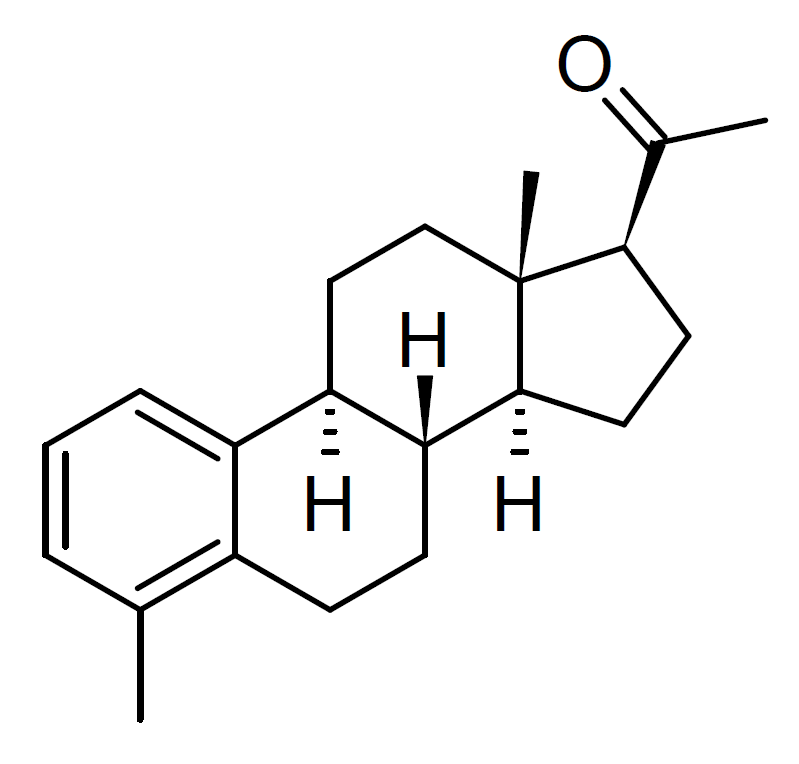

Identifiers
- IUPAC name: 1-[(8S,9S,13S,14S,17S)-4,13-dimethyl-6,7,8,9,11,12,14,15,16,17-decahydrocyclopenta[a]phenanthren-17-yl]ethanone

Chemical and physical data
- Formula: C_{21}H_{28}O
- Molar mass: 296.454 g·mol^{−1}
- 3D model (JSmol): Interactive image
- SMILES: C[C@]12CC[C@H]3[C@@H](CCc4c3cccc4C)[C@@H]1CC[C@@H]2C(=O)C
- InChI: InChI=1S/C21H28O/c1-13-5-4-6-16-15(13)7-8-18-17(16)11-12-21(3)19(14(2)22)9-10-20(18)21/h4-6,17-20H,7-12H2,1-3H3/t17-,18-,19-,20+,21-/m1/s1; Key:QHOSKNZHWGWGMX-SSSFQFABSA-N

S42 is a fully synthetic steroidal selective androgen receptor modulator (SARM) developed for the treatment of muscle wasting in the elderly.

== See also ==
- MK-4541
- YK-11
