= Kenneth Murray (biologist) =

British molecular biologist (1930–2013)

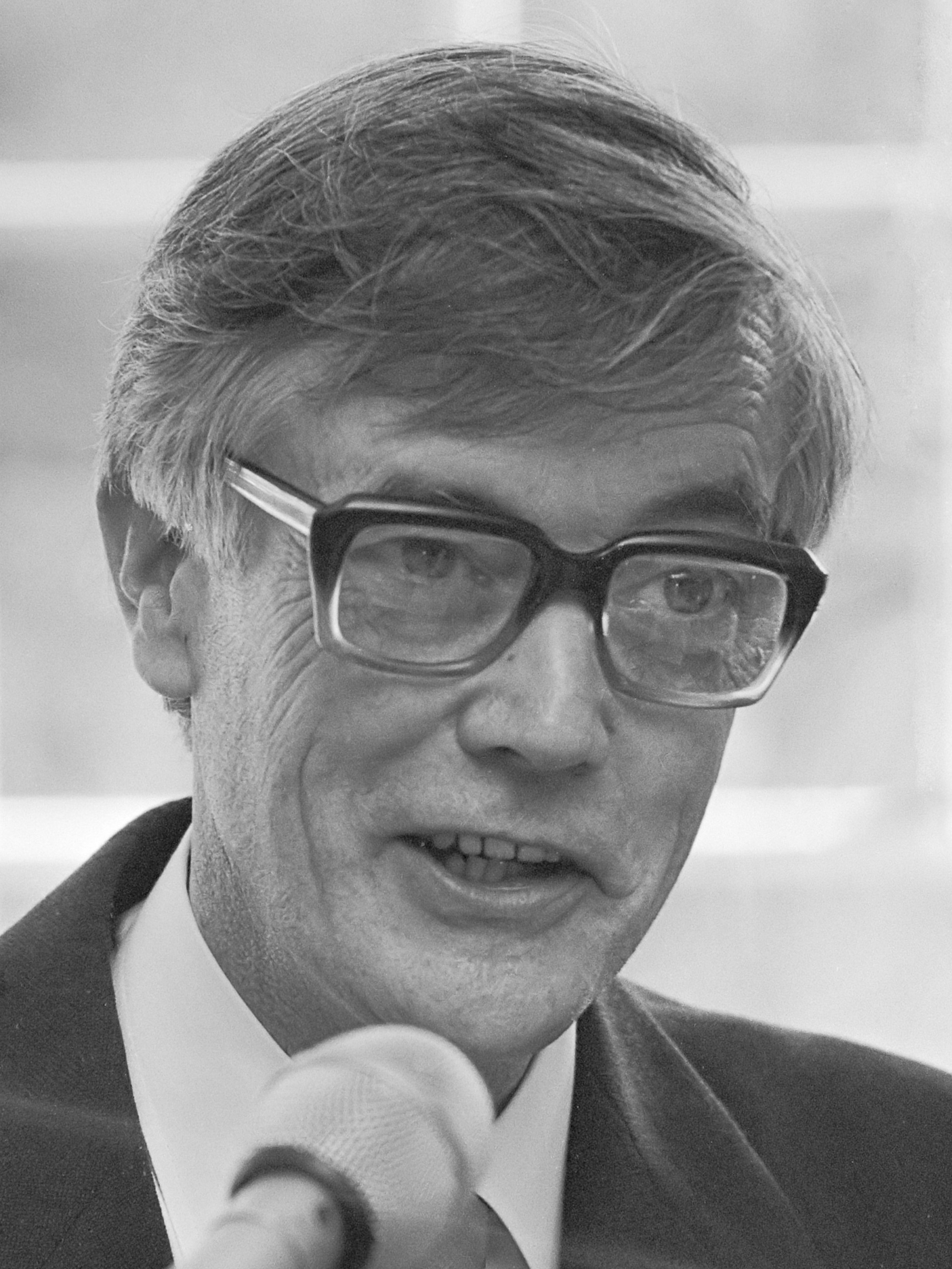
- Kenneth Murray (1983)
- Born: 30 December 1930; East Ardsley, Yorkshire, England
- Died: 7 April 2013 (aged 82); Edinburgh, Scotland
- Education: University of Birmingham (BSc, PhD)
- Spouse: Noreen Murray
- Awards: FRS
- Scientific career
- Fields: Molecular biology
- Workplaces: University of Edinburgh

Sir Kenneth "Ken" Murray (30 December 1930 – 7 April 2013) was a British molecular biologist and the Biogen Professor of Molecular Biology at the University of Edinburgh.

An important early figure in genetic engineering, Murray cofounded Biogen. There, he and his team developed one of the first vaccines against hepatitis B. Along with his wife, biologist Lady Noreen (née Parker), Murray also founded the Darwin Trust of Edinburgh, a charity supporting young biologists in their doctoral studies.

== Education and career ==
Murray achieved a 1st class honours degree in chemistry followed by PhD from the University of Birmingham. From 1960 to 1964 he was a researcher at J. Murray Luck's laboratory at Stanford University and from 1964 to 1967 he was a researcher at Fred Sanger's laboratory at Cambridge University. In 1967, he was appointed lecturer at the University of Edinburgh and in 1976 he became Head of Molecular Biology. In 1984 he was appointed Biogen Professor of Molecular Biology, a post which he retained until his retirement. He was elected a Fellow of the Royal Society in 1979, Fellow of the Royal Society of Edinburgh in 1989 and awarded the RSE Royal Medal in 2000 with the citation "For their outstanding contribution to the development of Biotechnology, both nationally and internationally, through his development of what is now known as recombinant DNA technology."

== Personal life ==
Murray was born in Yorkshire and brought up in the Midlands. He left school at the age of 16 to become a laboratory technician at Boots in Nottingham. He studied part-time and obtained a degree in chemistry and then a PhD in microbiology from University of Birmingham.

Sir Kenneth's wife, Lady Noreen Murray CBE, was elected a Fellow of the Royal Society in 1982. She died on 12 May 2011 aged 76.
