= Cl-4AS-1 =

Steroid drug

Clinical data
- Other names: N-(2-Chlorophenyl)-3-oxo-4-aza-4-methylandrost-1-en-17α-carboxamide

Identifiers
- IUPAC name: (4aα,4bβ,6aα,7α,9aβ,9bα,11aβ)-N-(2-chlorophenyl)-2,4a,4b,5,6,6a,7,8,9,9a,9b,10,11,11a-tetradecahydro-1,4,6a-trimethyl-2-oxo-1H-indeno[5,4-f]quinoline-7-carboxamide
- CAS Number: 188589-66-4
- PubChem CID: 9932961
- ChemSpider: 26232143
- UNII: 24SF5976Y2
- CompTox Dashboard (EPA): DTXSID001044196

Chemical and physical data
- Formula: C_{26}H_{33}ClN_{2}O_{2}
- Molar mass: 441.01 g·mol^{−1}
- 3D model (JSmol): Interactive image
- SMILES: C[C@]12CC[C@H]3[C@H]([C@@H]1CC[C@@H]2C(=O)NC4=CC=CC=C4Cl)CC[C@@H]5[C@@]3(C=CC(=O)N5C)C
- InChI: InChI=1S/C26H33ClN2O2/c1-25-14-12-18-16(8-11-22-26(18,2)15-13-23(30)29(22)3)17(25)9-10-19(25)24(31)28-21-7-5-4-6-20(21)27/h4-7,13,15-19,22H,8-12,14H2,1-3H3,(H,28,31)/t16-,17-,18-,19+,22+,25-,26+/m0/s1; Key:CTVXDPDUOKQBKZ-GFNRTWGOSA-N

Cl-4AS-1 is a dual anabolic–androgenic steroid (AAS) and 5α-reductase inhibitor. It is a potent and selective full agonist of the androgen receptor (IC_{50} = 12 nM) and inhibitor of 5α-reductase types I and II (IC_{50} = 6 and 10 nM, respectively). Structurally, Cl-4AS-1 is a 4-azasteroid.

== See also ==
- MK-0773
- MK-4541
- TFM-4AS-1
- YK-11
