= Bioverativ =

American biotechnology company

Bioverativ Inc.
- Type: Subsidiary
- Traded as: Nasdaq: BIVV
- Industry: Biotechnology
- Founded: 2016; 10 years ago (Spun off from Biogen)
- Key people: John G. Cox (CEO)
- Products: Alprolix, Eloctate
- Number of employees: 400
- Parent: Sanofi
- Website: sanofi.com

Bioverativ Inc. is an American multinational biotechnology company that specializes in the discovery, development, and delivery of therapies for the treatment of haemophilia. Bioverativ competes with Baxalta (acquired by Shire Plc in 2016), Pfizer and Novo Nordisk. The company traded on the NASDAQ exchange under the ticker symbol BIVV until Sanofi completed its acquisition on March 8, 2018.

== History ==
In May 2016 Biogen announced that it would spin off its hemophilia drug business (Eloctate and Alprolix) into a separate public company. In August, Biogen announced they would call the spun off company Bioverativ to show heritage with Biogen, and would be spun off in early 2017. On December 22, the Securities and Exchange Commission approved Bioverativ's registration statement, with the official separation date of the two companies being pegged at February 2017. In February, Biogen investors received a special dividend of one share of Bioverativ stock for every two shares of Biogen stock held as of January 17. Bioverativ began trading on January 12, 2017.

In May 2017, the company announced it would acquire True North Therapeutics for $825 million, strengthening Bioverativ's pipeline with the acquisition of TNT009 – a treatment for cold agglutinin disease.

In January 2018, Sanofi announced that it would acquire the business, for $11.6 billion.

After the Bioverativ board was accused of assisting a hedge fund manager to profit via insider trading on the $11.6 billion Sanofi acquisition, in April 2023, Bioverativ and Sanofi settled the case for $84 million.

=== Acquisition history ===
The following is an illustration of the company's major mergers and acquisitions and historical predecessors:

- Bioverativ
  - True North Therapeutics
    (Acq 2017)
  - - Bioverativ
      (Spun off 2016 from Biogen)

== Products ==
The company has two current products; Alprolix and Eloctate, both products provided combined revenues of $604 million in 2015, and $640 million in the first nine months of 2016 (contributing to ~6% of Biogens' total revenue. These products are marketed in the United States, European Union, Japan, Canada and Australia.
