= Noreen Murray =

British molecular biologist (1935–2011)

Noreen Murray CBE FRS FRSE
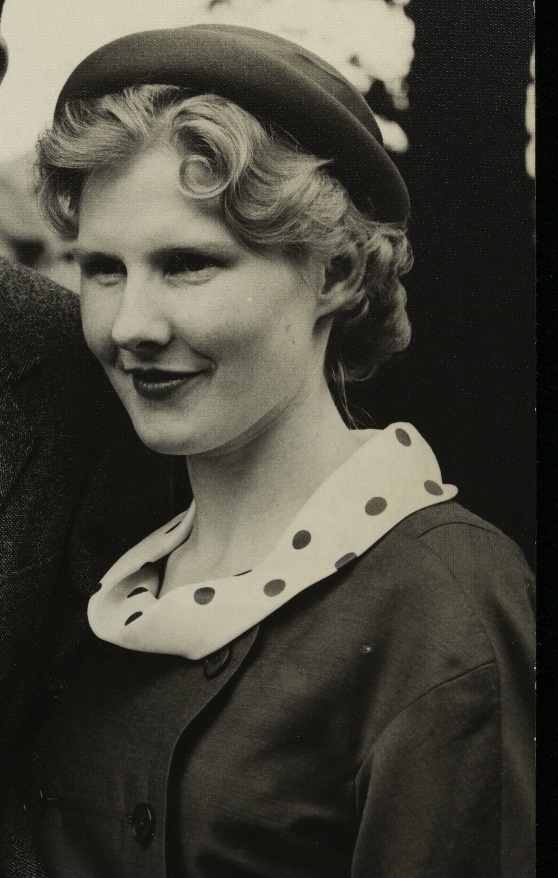
- Noreen Murray
- Born: Noreen Elizabeth Parker; 26 February 1935; Lancashire, England
- Died: 12 May 2011 (aged 76); Edinburgh, Scotland
- Education: King's College London; University of Birmingham
- Spouse: Kenneth Murray (m. 1958)
- Awards: Fellow of the Royal Society
- Scientific career
- Fields: Molecular genetics
- Workplaces: University of Edinburgh; Stanford University; University of Cambridge; Medical Research Council (UK); European Molecular Biology Laboratory

Noreen Elizabeth, Lady Murray CBE FRS FRSE (née Parker; 26 February 1935 – 12 May 2011) was an English molecular geneticist who helped pioneer recombinant DNA technology (genetic engineering) by creating a series of bacteriophage lambda vectors into which genes could be inserted and expressed in order to examine their function. During her career she was recognised internationally as a pioneer and one of Britain's most distinguished and highly respected molecular geneticists. Until her 2001 retirement she held a personal chair in molecular genetics at the University of Edinburgh. She was president of the Genetical Society, vice president of the Royal Society, and a member of the UK Science and Technology Honours Committee.

== Education ==
Noreen Parker was brought up in the village of Read, Lancashire, then from the age of five in Bolton-le-Sands. She was educated at Lancaster Girls' Grammar School, at King's College London (BSc), and received her PhD from the University of Birmingham in 1959.

== Career ==
Murray was a committed researcher. She worked at Stanford University, University of Cambridge, and the Medical Research Council (UK) before first joining the University of Edinburgh faculty in 1967. She briefly moved to the European Molecular Biology Laboratory from 1980 to 1982, but returned to Edinburgh, where she was awarded a personal chair of molecular genetics in 1988. At Edinburgh, she produced a considerable body of work focused on uncovering the mechanisms and biology of restriction enzymes, and their adaptation as tools underpinning modern biological research. It is notable that she has many single author publications; she was generally the main instigator and sole technical contributor. In 1968 Noreen had become interested in the phenomenon of host-controlled restriction (the ability of bacterial cells to "restrict" foreign DNA) and decided to study this phenomenon in Escherichia coli using bacteriophage lambda and her knowledge of bacteriophage genetics.

She was married to Sir Kenneth Murray, also a noted biochemist with whom she helped develop a vaccine against hepatitis B, the first genetically engineered vaccine approved for human use. She, Ken and colleague Bill Brammar, led the development of genetic engineering, putting the UK ahead in revolutionary DNA research. Noreen and Ken were among the first to realise that the ability to cut DNA with restriction enzymes made it possible to join different DNA molecules to produce recombinant DNA molecules, and clone DNA sequences. Their work had a lasting impact and shaped all areas of biology and biotechnology. In their published work together, Noreen's contributions are clearly identifiable; she being the geneticist, he the biochemist.

Her obituary describes the impact she made on fellow women scientists in her workplace. "Her achievements came at a time when it was not always easy for women to make a career in science, and it is a measure of her ability and determination that she reached the top of her profession despite occasionally contending with the unconscious prejudice of the scientific establishment. Perhaps because of this Noreen was particularly attentive to the careers of her female colleagues and delighted in their success." "She was an exceptional mentor to those who worked with or around her."

In 1983 the couple established the Darwin Trust of Edinburgh. To this trust they donated the royalty earnings from the Hepatitis B vaccine. The charity supports education and research in natural science. This Trust has provided funds to construct the University of Edinburgh Darwin Library, to contribute to building the Michael Swann Building, and provided numerous bursaries to support postgraduates and undergraduates from overseas to study in Edinburgh. In 2009, Noreen joined the Advisory Panel of Edinburgh bioscience firm BigDNA, which designs and develops vaccines based on the lambda phage carrying DNA-based vaccines.

The Noreen and Kenneth Murray Library was built at the King's Buildings Science Campus at the University of Edinburgh, recognising the couple's distinguished careers and their commitment to the advancement of science and engineering.

== Death ==
She was diagnosed with a form of motor neurone disease in 2010. In 2011, despite being unable to speak she continued to work and deal with correspondence via notes. She died with Ken at her side at the Marie Curie Hospice, Edinburgh, on 12 May 2011, aged 76.

== Awards and honours ==
Her many contributions to science have been honoured by Fellowships of the Royal Societies of Edinburgh and London. Lady Murray was elected to the Royal Society in 1982 and the Royal Society of Edinburgh in 1989. She has received honorary degrees from the University of Warwick, the University of Manchester Institute of Science and Technology, the University of Birmingham, and Lancaster University. She has also been given the Fred Griffith Review Lectureship of the Society for General Microbiology and in 1989, for her work with lambda phage, the Gabor Medal of the Royal Society.

She was made a Commander of the Order of the British Empire in the New Year Honours list for 2002.

The Noreen and Kenneth Murray Library in Edinburgh University's King's Buildings complex is named in her honour.
