= MK-4541 =

Abandoned drug

Clinical data
- Other names: MK4541
- Routes of administration: Oral
- Drug class: Selective androgen receptor modulator; 5α-Reductase inhibitor

Identifiers
- IUPAC name: 2,2,2-trifluoroethyl N-[(1S,3aS,3bS,5aR,9aR,9bS,11aS)-6,9a,11a-trimethyl-7-oxo-2,3,3a,3b,4,5,5a,9b,10,11-decahydro-1H-indeno[5,4-f]quinolin-1-yl]carbamate
- CAS Number: 796885-38-6
- PubChem CID: 59691338
- DrugBank: DB17016
- ChemSpider: 88298114

Chemical and physical data
- Formula: C_{22}H_{31}F_{3}N_{2}O_{3}
- Molar mass: 428.496 g·mol^{−1}
- 3D model (JSmol): Interactive image
- SMILES: C[C@]12CC[C@H]3[C@H]([C@@H]1CC[C@@H]2NC(=O)OCC(F)(F)F)CC[C@@H]4[C@@]3(C=CC(=O)N4C)C
- InChI: InChI=1S/C22H31F3N2O3/c1-20-10-8-15-13(4-7-17-21(15,2)11-9-18(28)27(17)3)14(20)5-6-16(20)26-19(29)30-12-22(23,24)25/h9,11,13-17H,4-8,10,12H2,1-3H3,(H,26,29)/t13-,14-,15-,16-,17+,20-,21+/m0/s1; Key:OGBFNZPDLOPGEO-OCWMMRLVSA-N

MK-4541 is a dual selective androgen receptor modulator (SARM) and 5α-reductase inhibitor (5α-RI) which has been of interest for the potential treatment of prostate cancer but has not been marketed at this time. It is intended for use by mouth.

The drug is a steroidal androgen receptor (AR) modulator with mixed agonistic (androgenic) and antagonistic (antiandrogenic) effects. In preclinical research and animal studies, MK-4541 has been found to have androgenic or anabolic effects in muscle and bone, to strongly suppress testosterone levels (likely via androgenic antigonadotropic effects), and to have antiandrogenic effects in the prostate and in prostate cancer cells. Structurally, it is specifically a 4-azasteroid derivative.

MK-4541 was first described in the scientific literature by 2014. It was identified by screening of 3,000 compounds that were manually designed and predicted to have SARM activity. The drug was developed by Merck. It might be being developed for potential medical use, but its developmental status has not been publicly disclosed. In any case, MK-4541 is not known to have advanced past preclinical studies as of 2020.

== See also ==
- Cl-4AS-1
- MK-0773
- S42 (selective androgen receptor modulator)
- TFM-4AS-1
- YK-11
