= Howard Birndorf =

Biotechnology entrepreneur

Howard Civian Birndorf (born February 21, 1950) is a biotechnology entrepreneur and one of the founders of the biotech industry in San Diego, California.

== Early life ==
Birndorf was born in Detroit in 1950. Birndorf received his B.A. in Biology from Oakland University, an M.S. in Biochemistry from Wayne State University, and has received honorary Doctor of Science degrees from Oakland University and Wayne State University.

== Career ==
Along with former University of California professor and current venture capitalist Ivor Royston, Birndorf founded San Diego's first biotech in 1978, the monoclonal antibody company Hybritech. The company was subsequently bought by Eli Lilly and Company in 1986, and Birndorf went on to found a number of other successful companies including Gen-Probe, IDEC Pharmaceuticals (which merged with Biogen to form Biogen-Idec), and Ligand Pharmaceuticals. Birndorf was also involved in the formation of Gensia (Sicor), and was a founding Director of Neurocrine Biosciences. He was the founder and co-chair of the Coalition for 21st Century Medicine and was founder, Chairman and CEO of Nanogen, Inc.
