= Pharmacopeia, Inc. =

Biotechnology company

Pharmacopeia was a public biotechnology company that pioneered the field of small molecule combinatorial chemistry.

Pharmacopeia was founded by Larry Bock and Drs. Michael Wigler, Clark Still and Jack Chabala.

Pharmacopeia went public in 1996 and was acquired by Ligand Pharmaceuticals on December 13, 2008.
