= Gen-Probe =

- Company type: Subsidiary
- Traded as: Nasdaq: GPRO
- Industry: Biotechnology, pharmaceuticals, life sciences
- Founded: 1983
- Founders: Howard Birndorf and Thomas H. Adams
- Defunct: August 1, 2012
- Fate: Acquired
- Successor: Hologic
- Headquarters: San Diego, California, United States
- Products: Clinical diagnostics, blood screening, transplantation products, research products
- Website: www.gen-probe.com

Gen-Probe was an American company based in San Diego, in California, specializing in clinical diagnostics, blood screening, transplantation products and research products.

The company's molecular diagnostics products were used for diagnosis of infectious diseases, blood screening, analyzing blood transfusions for immune response, testing coagulation pathways, and organ transplantation viability. Their products and services also included technology and know-how in biomedical research and drug development. On 1 August 2012, Gen-Probe was merged with Hologic.
