= MK-0773 =

Abandoned drug

Clinical data
- Other names: PF-05314882; N-(3H-Imidazo(4,5-b)pyridin-2-ylmethyl)-2-fluoro-4-methyl-3-oxo-4-aza-5α-androst-1-ene-17β-carboxamide
- Routes of administration: By mouth

Identifiers
- IUPAC name: (1S,3aS,3bS,5aR,9aS,9bS,11aS)-8-Fluoro-N-(1H-imidazo[4,5-b]pyridin-2-ylmethyl)-6,9a,11a-trimethyl-7-oxo-2,3,3a,3b,4,5,5a,9b,10,11-decahydro-1H-indeno[5,4-f]quinoline-1-carboxamide
- CAS Number: 606101-58-0
- PubChem CID: 11950726
- ChemSpider: 10125035
- UNII: 5730VNW22X
- CompTox Dashboard (EPA): DTXSID701025274

Chemical and physical data
- Formula: C_{27}H_{34}FN_{5}O_{2}
- Molar mass: 479.600 g·mol^{−1}
- 3D model (JSmol): Interactive image
- SMILES: C[C@]12CC[C@H]3[C@H]([C@@H]1CC[C@@H]2C(=O)NCC4=NC5=C(N4)C=CC=N5)CC[C@@H]6[C@@]3(C=C(C(=O)N6C)F)C
- InChI: InChI=1S/C27H34FN5O2/c1-26-11-10-17-15(6-9-21-27(17,2)13-19(28)25(35)33(21)3)16(26)7-8-18(26)24(34)30-14-22-31-20-5-4-12-29-23(20)32-22/h4-5,12-13,15-18,21H,6-11,14H2,1-3H3,(H,30,34)(H,29,31,32)/t15-,16-,17-,18+,21+,26-,27+/m0/s1; Key:GBEUKTWTUSPHEE-JWJWXJQQSA-N

MK-0773, also known as PF-05314882, is a steroidal, orally active selective androgen receptor modulator (SARM) that was under development by Merck and GTx for the treatment of sarcopenia (loss of muscle mass) in women and men. Clinical trials for sarcopenia began in late 2007 but the collaboration between Merck and GTx ended in early 2010 and GTx terminated development of MK-0773 shortly thereafter. MK-0773 was developed as a more advanced version of the related compound TFM-4AS-1.

MK-0773 is a 4-azasteroid and a potent and selective agonist of the androgen receptor (AR). It binds to the AR with an EC_{50} of 6.6 nM and is a partial agonist in transactivation modulation of the AR with an IP of 25 nM and E_{max} of 78% and has a TRAF2 E_{max}of 29% and an N/C interaction (virilization-related) counterscreen assay E_{max} of 2%. That is, it produces promoter activation but induces the N/C interaction almost negligibly. MK-0773 is reportedly four times as potent as testosterone as an agonist of the AR. The drug is selective and does not bind to other steroid hormone receptors such as the progesterone receptor or glucocorticoid receptor and shows no significant inhibition of 5α-reductase (IC_{50} > 10 μM). In addition, it is non-aromatizable and hence has no potential for estrogenic effects or side effects, like gynecomastia. MK-0773 had similar effects on lipid metabolism relative to DHT, including a decrease in total cholesterol and high-density lipoprotein (HDL) of a similar magnitude.

MK-0773 shows tissue-selective androgenic effects in vivo in animals. It increases lean body mass with maximal anabolic effects that are approximately 80% of those of dihydrotestosterone (DHT). However, it had less than 5% of the effect of DHT on uterine weight, about 30 to 50% of the increase of sebaceous gland area induced by DHT, and increased the weight of the seminal vesicles by 12% of that of DHT at the highest dosage assessed. It had similarly reduced effects on the prostate gland. No significant increase in gene expression of six candidate genes related to virilization was observed. As such, MK-0773 shows a profile of an anabolic SARM with limited effects on sebaceous glands and reproductive tissues in animals and a reduced propensity for virilization.

In human clinical studies, MK-0773 produced anabolism in women and men while producing no or very low effects on sebaceous glands, the endometrium, or the prostate gland after 12 weeks of treatment. A decrease in total cholesterol and HDL was also observed in the clinical studies. MK-0773 produced a significant increase in lean body mass in elderly (≥65 years of age) women with sarcopenia and moderate physical dysfunction. It also increased muscle strength relative to placebo but this failed to reach statistical significance. MK-0773 has been associated with elevated liver enzymes in clinical studies.

MK-0773 has been encountered as a novel designer drug.

== See also ==
- Cl-4AS-1
- MK-4541
- TFM-4AS-1
- YK-11
