= S-40503 =

Chemical compound

Legal status
- Legal status: US: Investigational New Drug

Identifiers
- IUPAC name: 2-[4-(dimethylamino)-6-nitro-1,2,3,4-tetrahydroquinolin-2-yl]-2-methylpropan-1-ol
- CAS Number: 404920-28-1
- PubChem CID: 9879175
- ChemSpider: 8054852
- UNII: TBF49WHM83
- CompTox Dashboard (EPA): DTXSID801027128

Chemical and physical data
- Formula: C_{15}H_{23}N_{3}O_{3}
- Molar mass: 293.367 g·mol^{−1}
- 3D model (JSmol): Interactive image
- SMILES: O=N(=O)c2cc1C(N(C)C)CC(C(C)(C)CO)Nc1cc2
- InChI: InChI=1S/C15H23N3O3/c1-15(2,9-19)14-8-13(17(3)4)11-7-10(18(20)21)5-6-12(11)16-14/h5-7,13-14,16,19H,8-9H2,1-4H3; Key:YNYAUBNZRZVNLX-UHFFFAOYSA-N

S-40503 is an investigational selective androgen receptor modulator (SARM) developed by the Japanese company Kaken Pharmaceuticals, which was developed for the treatment of osteoporosis. SARMs are a new class of drugs that produce tissue-specific anabolic effects in some tissues such as muscle and bone, but without stimulating androgen receptors in other tissues such as in the prostate gland, thus avoiding side effects such as benign prostatic hyperplasia which can occur following treatment with unselective androgens like testosterone or anabolic steroids.

S-40503 is a SARM that shows good functional selectivity for bone tissue, and has relatively little effect on muscle mass and no observable effect on the prostate gland. In animal studies, it was shown to increase both bone mineral density and biomechanical strength of femoral cortical bone, and at low doses showed anabolic effects only on bone tissue, while at higher doses both bone and muscle growth were affected, yet prostate gland enlargement was not seen at any dose tested. The lack of virilizing effects means that S-40503 may even be suitable for use in women, which would be a substantial advantage over existing drugs as women tend to be more likely to suffer from osteoporosis, and are generally contraindicated from taking anabolic steroids due to the risk of side effects such as masculinisation and hirsutism. Since these promising initial studies, no further data about S-40503 has been published by Kaken, and it is thought that rather than being developed for human use itself, S-40503 may be more likely to be used as a lead compound for the development of novel derivatives with similar bone anabolic effects, but longer in vivo half-life and better bioavailability.

Selective androgen receptor modulators may also be used by athletes to assist in training and increase physical stamina and fitness, potentially producing effects similar to anabolic steroids but with significantly less side effects. For this reason, SARMs have already been banned by the World Anti-Doping Agency since January 2008 despite no drugs from this class yet being in clinical use, and blood tests for all known SARMs are currently being developed. S-40503 was encountered as a novel designer drug by at least 2020.
