= LGD-2941 =

Chemical compound

Identifiers
- IUPAC name: 6-[(2R,5R)-2-methyl-5-[(1R)-2,2,2-trifluoro-1-hydroxyethyl]pyrrolidin-1-yl]-4-(trifluoromethyl)-1H-quinolin-2-one
- CAS Number: 847235-85-2
- PubChem CID: 16750192
- DrugBank: 05234
- ChemSpider: 24694857
- UNII: 27H8PR7JGK
- ChEMBL: ChEMBL467888

Chemical and physical data
- Formula: C_{17}H_{16}F_{6}N_{2}O_{2}
- Molar mass: 394.317 g·mol^{−1}
- 3D model (JSmol): Interactive image
- SMILES: C[C@@H]1CC[C@@H](N1C2=CC3=C(C=C2)NC(=O)C=C3C(F)(F)F)[C@H](C(F)(F)F)O
- InChI: InChI=1S/C17H16F6N2O2/c1-8-2-5-13(15(27)17(21,22)23)25(8)9-3-4-12-10(6-9)11(16(18,19)20)7-14(26)24-12/h3-4,6-8,13,15,27H,2,5H2,1H3,(H,24,26)/t8-,13-,15-/m1/s1; Key:HWLLYFXDDGGHOE-BCSUUIJWSA-N

LGD-2941 is a drug which acts as a selective androgen receptor modulator (SARM). It is no longer being developed.

== See also ==
- List of investigational sexual dysfunction drugs
