= Pascal Photocoagulator =

The PASCAL Photocoagulator is an integrated semi-automatic pattern scan laser photocoagulation system designed to treat ocular diseases using a single shot or predetermined pattern array. The device is for ophthalmologists, particularly those that focus in vitreo-retinal surgery, a type of eye surgery. It was developed by OptiMedica, an ophthalmic medical device company located in Silicon Valley (Sunnyvale, CA).

== History ==
The PASCAL (PAtterned SCAnning Laser) method of photocoagulation was initially developed at Stanford University. OptiMedica founders worked together at Coherent, and based on their experience in the ophthalmic laser industry, recognized the need for improved safety, precision, comfort and speed of photocoagulation procedures for eye diseases.

Ophthalmic company, Topcon Corp. has distributed the PASCAL system since 2008, and acquired OptiMedica's retina and glaucoma technology in August 2010.

== Ophthalmic laser delivery systems ==
Most ophthalmic laser delivery systems include:

- A laser source, such as the Nd:YAG laser used in Pascal
- A delivery device such as a slit lamp or laser indirect ophthalmoscope (LIO)
- A control system for selecting power and duration
- A method for selecting spot size

The Pascal system is fully integrated with a touch screen GUI, advanced slit lamp optics, slit lamp mounted micromanipulator, and ergonomic features for the physician and patient.

== Pascal Method - pattern scanning ==
In scanning applications, a control system applies an electric current proportional to the desired location of a beam of light to a high speed, sensitive, limited rotation motor called a galvanometer (commonly referred to as a galvo). A scanner is a galvo with a mirror attached to it. When the current is changed, the scanner quickly steers the laser beam to the desired location. Closed loop circuits ensure that the desired position is precisely reached.

In Pascal, control selections such as pattern and spot size from the graphic user interface are translated into (F,X,Y) coordinates. Three scanners deliver laser light to the retina in multi-spot patterns by controlling the x-position (X), y-position(Y) and fiber selection(F) for the placement and size of the laser beam.

The use of a FPGA from National Instruments enables fast scanning speed and a short response time of 4 microseconds for critical measurements and controlled feedback.

== Indications for use ==
Pascal Photocoagulator was approved in 2005 by the U.S. Food and Drug Administration through a 510(k) for treating vascular and structural abnormalities of the retina and choroids including:

- Proliferative and non-proliferative diabetic retinopathy
- Choroidal neovascularization
- Branch and central retinal vein occlusion
- Age-related macular degeneration
- Lattice degeneration
- Retinal tears and detachments
- Iridotomy
- Iridectomy
- Trabeculoplasty in angle closure and open angle glaucoma

Pascal photocoagulator also has [CE Mark] for international sale.

== Awards ==
In 2007, OptiMedica received a R&D 100 Award for its work on the Pascal Photocoagulator. The Pascal Photocoagulator received a Medical Design Excellence Award gold medal in 2007 and a Wall Street Journal Technology Innovation award in 2008.
