= TFM-4AS-1 =

Abandoned drug

Clinical data
- Other names: N-[2-(Trifluoromethyl)phenyl]-3-oxo-4-aza-4-methyl-5α-androst-1-en-17α-carboxamide

Identifiers
- IUPAC name: (1S,3aS,3bS,5aR,9aR,9bS,11aS)-6,9a,11a-trimethyl-7-oxo-N-[2-(trifluoromethyl)phenyl]-2,3,3a,3b,4,5,5a,9b,10,11-decahydro-1H-indeno[5,4-f]quinoline-1-carboxamide
- CAS Number: 188589-61-9
- PubChem CID: 90488882
- ChemSpider: 26232144

Chemical and physical data
- Formula: C_{27}H_{33}F_{3}N_{2}O_{2}
- Molar mass: 474.568 g·mol^{−1}
- 3D model (JSmol): Interactive image
- SMILES: C[C@]12CC[C@H]3[C@H]([C@@H]1CC[C@@H]2C(=O)NC4=CC=CC=C4C(F)(F)F)CCC5[C@@]3(C=CC(=O)N5C)C
- InChI: InChI=1S/C27H33F3N2O2/c1-25-14-12-18-16(8-11-22-26(18,2)15-13-23(33)32(22)3)17(25)9-10-20(25)24(34)31-21-7-5-4-6-19(21)27(28,29)30/h4-7,13,15-18,20,22H,8-12,14H2,1-3H3,(H,31,34)/t16-,17-,18-,20+,22?,25-,26+/m0/s1; Key:YFBLEKKYWFJKBP-HRVOXWHZSA-N

TFM-4AS-1 is a dual selective androgen receptor modulator (SARM) and 5α-reductase inhibitor. It is a potent and selective partial agonist (E_{max} = 55%) of the androgen receptor (IC_{50} = 30 nM) and inhibitor of 5α-reductase types I and II (IC_{50} = 2 and 3 nM, respectively). TFM-4AS-1 shows tissue-selective androgenic effects; it promotes the accumulation of bone and muscle mass and has reduced effects in reproductive tissues and sebaceous glands. In an animal study, TFM-4AS-1 stimulated sebaceous gland formation only 31% as much as dihydrotestosterone (DHT) at doses that were as anabolic or more so than DHT. In addition, TFM-4AS-1 only weakly promoted growth of the prostate gland and it partially antagonized the actions of DHT in the seminal vesicles and endogenous androgens in the prostate gland. Structurally, TFM-4AS-1 is a 4-azasteroid. A structurally related and more advanced version of TFM-4AS-1, MK-0773, was developed and pursued for potential pharmaceutical use.

== See also ==
- Cl-4AS-1
- MK-0773
- MK-4541
- YK-11
