= Tom Byers (professor) =

American professor

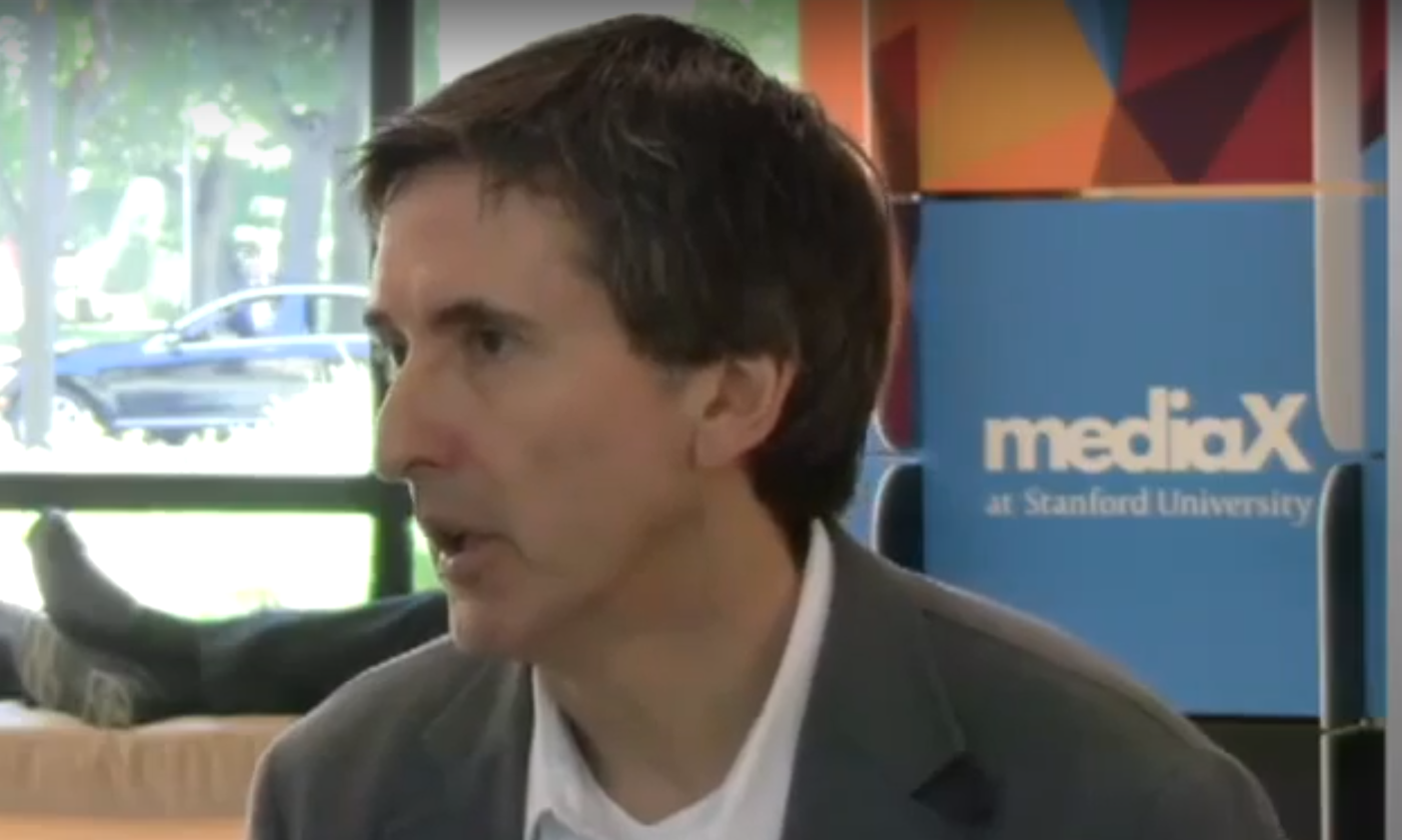
- Education: University of California, Berkeley; BA, Industrial Engineering (1975); MBA, (1980); PhD, Management Science (1982)
- Relatives: Brook Byers

Thomas H. "Tom" Byers is a professor at Stanford University in the United States. He concentrates in the area of high-technology ventures and serves as the faculty director for the Stanford Technology Ventures Program.

== Career ==
Byers was an early employee at Go Corporation and Symantec. At Stanford he has established and directs Stanford Technology Ventures Program to train and encourage students to become entrepreneurs. Since 2004, he has taught "Introduction to High Technology Entrepreneurship" class, which in many respect parallels business school case study management courses, but with a specific high technology orientation. Byers was one of the founding faculty members of Singularity University, and lectures there on topics related to entrepreneurship and new technology ventures.

Byers serves on the Board of Directors for Reactivity, MyThings, and Flywheel Ventures. He also serves on the following advisory boards and committees: American Society for Engineering Education's Entrepreneurship Division, Harvard Business School's California Research Center, and the National Foundation for Teaching Entrepreneurship (NFTE) for inner-city youth.

== Honors and awards ==
Byers holds the McCoy University Fellow in Undergraduate Education endowed chair at Stanford. He was awarded the 2005 Gores Award for excellence in teaching, the 2002 Tau Beta Pi Award for excellence in undergraduate teaching, the 2005 ASEE Kauffman Award for excellence in engineering and technology entrepreneurship education, the 2005 USASBE Entrepreneurship Educator of the Year Award, and the 2003 Leavey Award for excellence in private enterprise education. In 2004, he was named Northern California Entrepreneur of the Year in Ernst & Young's competition, awarded the Academy of Management's Innovation in Entrepreneurship Teaching Award and Price-Babson's Appel Prize.

== Education ==
Byers is a triple-degree alumnus of the University of California, Berkeley, where he earned his bachelor's degree in industrial engineering and operations research in 1975, his MBA in 1980, and his Ph.D. in management science in 1982.

== Personal life ==
He is also brother of venture capitalist Brook Byers.
