= Opicinumab =

Monoclonal antibody

Monoclonal antibody
- Type: Whole antibody
- Source: Human
- Target: LINGO-1 protein

Clinical data
- Other names: BIIB033
- ATC code: none

Identifiers
- CAS Number: 1422268-07-2
- ChemSpider: none
- UNII: WX1WTN0Y15
- KEGG: D11767

Chemical and physical data
- Formula: C_{6406}H_{9896}N_{1708}O_{2012}S_{44}
- Molar mass: 144442.22 g·mol^{−1}

Opicinumab (BIIB033) is a fully human monoclonal antibody designed for the treatment of multiple sclerosis, acute optic neuritis (AON), and other associated demyelinating diseases. A biologic drug, it is designed to function as a LINGO-1 protein antagonist, known as "Anti-Lingo-1".

Some Phase II clinical trials have been carried out, but preliminary results indicate that primary study endpoints were not met and that opicinumab exhibits unexpected dose-response relationships. Further studies were planned by the company, as opicinumab still was deemed to show potential for clinical efficacy in the treatment of MS.

== Mechanism of action ==
Opicinumab is designed to prevent the advancement of demyelination associated with neurodegenerative disorders, specifically MS. It is believed to function by allowing young cells, which would normally be prevented from maturing by the LINGO-1 protein, to mature into functional oligodendrocytes. Oligodendrocytes support nerve axons and serve to maintain the myelin sheath that allows for the effective conduction of axon potentials. LINGO-1 is only found in the Central Nervous System (CNS) and is thought to be at least a partial causative agent of MS, an autoimmune disorder. It is thought that by allowing oligodendrocytes to mature, further disability advancement caused by MS can be prevented, with reversal of demyelination associated with MS potentially achievable.

== Clinical trials ==
Phase I and Phase II clinical trials are currently ongoing for opicinumab. Completed Phase I trials assessed safety and efficacy in healthy people and in MS patients, as well as investigated pharmacokinetic parameters of the drug.

Biogen has an ongoing Phase 1 trial that is investigating the safety of ocipinumab produced via two different manufacturing processes in healthy individuals. That trial is set to conclude November 2016.

=== Acute optic neuritis ===
The completed Phase II trial, dubbed RENEW by Biogen, studied the potential clinical efficacy of opicinumab in treating AON, more specifically in repairing damage done to the optic nerve. The study successfully reached its primary endpoint and showed a 34 percent partial recovery of optic nerve latency, a measure of the time of conduction from the retina to the visual cortex. On RENEW's secondary endpoint, there was no statistically significant change in either visual function or retinal thickness.

=== Multiple sclerosis ===
The second completed Phase II clinical trial for opicinumab, called SYNERGY by Biogen, concluded in March 2016 but failed to reach its primary endpoint, which was an integrated measure of several MS progression and disability markers: ambulation, extremity functionality, cognition, and other typical indicators of MS. Results from the study also showed highly unanticipated dose-response relationships in the MS patient population that will likely require further clinical trials to investigate satisfactorily.

== Intellectual property ==
Biogen, Inc. filed its first patent application with WIPO (World Intellectual Property Organization) in 2008, wherein the potential to target LINGO-1 in patients with MS was described.

In January 2016, Biogen filed a second patent application with WIPO that specifically described and protected BIIB003 (opicinumab). By filing with WIPO, the overseeing organization for the Patent Cooperation Treaty (PCT), Biogen gains an extra year of intellectual property (IP) exclusivity after submitting its international patent application with WIPO to apply for patents in all desired member states of the PCT. Therefore, Biogen has until January 2017 to file patent applications for opicinumab in multiple countries of its choosing, after which its IP will no longer be protected by the PCT.
