= YK-11 =

Steroid drug

Clinical data
- Other names: YK11; myostine; (17α,20E)-17,20-[(1-methoxyethylidene)bis(oxy)]-3-oxo-19-norpregna-4,20-diene-21-carboxylic acid methyl ester
- Drug class: Selective androgen receptor modulator

Identifiers
- IUPAC name: Methyl (2E)-2-[(8R,9S,10R,13S,14S,17S)-2'-methoxy-2',13-dimethyl-3-oxospiro[1,2,6,7,8,9,10,11,12,14,15,16-dodecahydrocyclopenta[a]phenanthrene-17,5'-1,3-dioxolane]-4'-ylidene]acetate
- CAS Number: 1370003-76-1
- PubChem CID: 119058028
- ChemSpider: 52085570
- UNII: Z9748J6B0R
- CompTox Dashboard (EPA): DTXSID301107018

Chemical and physical data
- Formula: C_{25}H_{34}O_{6}
- Molar mass: 430.541 g·mol^{−1}
- 3D model (JSmol): Interactive image
- SMILES: C[C@]12CC[C@H]3[C@H]([C@@H]1CC[C@@]24/C(=C\C(=O)OC)/OC(O4)(C)OC)CCC5=CC(=O)CC[C@H]35
- InChI: InChI=1S/C25H34O6/c1-23-11-9-18-17-8-6-16(26)13-15(17)5-7-19(18)20(23)10-12-25(23)21(14-22(27)28-3)30-24(2,29-4)31-25/h13-14,17-20H,5-12H2,1-4H3/b21-14+/t17-,18+,19+,20-,23-,24?,25+/m0/s1; Key:KCQHQCDHFVGNMK-PQUNLUOYSA-N

YK-11 is a synthetic steroidal selective androgen receptor modulator (SARM). It is a gene-selective partial agonist of the androgen receptor (AR) and does not induce the physical interaction between the NTD/AF1 and LBD/AF2 (known as the N/C interaction), which is required for full transactivation of the AR. The drug has anabolic activity in vitro in C2C12 myoblasts and shows greater potency than dihydrotestosterone (DHT) in this regard. It has been investigated as a potential treatment for sepsis-induced muscle wasting in animal studies. YK-11 has been encountered as a novel designer drug.

In 2022, Health Canada warned that SARMs such as myostine (YK-11) "are not authorized in Canada for any use and have not been reviewed by Health Canada for safety, effectiveness and quality. The use of bodybuilding products that contain SARMs can pose serious health risks such as heart attack, stroke and liver damage. The long-term effects on the body are unknown."

== See also ==
- Cl-4AS-1
- MK-0773
- MK-4541
- TFM-4AS-1
