= Peginterferon beta-1a =

Medication

Clinical data
- Trade names: Plegridy, Plegridy Pen
- Other names: BIIB-017
- AHFS/Drugs.com: Monograph
- MedlinePlus: a614059
- License data: US DailyMed: Peginterferon beta-1a
- Pregnancy category: AU: D
- Routes of administration: Subcutaneous injection
- Drug class: Antineoplastic agent
- ATC code: L03AB13 (WHO)

Legal status
- Legal status: AU: S4 (Prescription only); CA: ℞-only; US: ℞-only; EU: Rx-only; In general: ℞ (Prescription only)

Identifiers
- IUPAC name: 1-Ether with N-(3-hydroxy-2-methylpropyl)interferon β-1a (human) α-methyl-ω-hydroxy-poly(oxy-1,2-ethanediyl)
- CAS Number: 1211327-92-2
- DrugBank: DB09122
- UNII: I8309403R0
- KEGG: D10483

Chemical and physical data
- Formula: C913H1417N246O256PS7 [C2H4O]n
- Molar mass: 44000 g·mol^{−1}

Peginterferon beta-1a, sold under the brand name Plegridy, is medication used to treat multiple sclerosis.

The most common side effects include headache, muscle pain, joint pain, influenza (flu)-like symptoms, pyrexia (fever), chills, asthenia (weakness), and erythema (reddening of the skin), pain or pruritus (itching) at the injection site.

Peginterferon beta-1a was approved for medical use in the United States and in the European Union in 2014.

== Medical uses ==
In the United States, peginterferon beta-1a is indicated for the treatment of relapsing forms of multiple sclerosis, to include clinically isolated syndrome, relapsing-remitting disease, and active secondary progressive disease, in adults.

In the European Union, peginterferon beta-1a is indicated for the treatment of relapsing remitting multiple sclerosis in adults.
