= Efmoroctocog alfa =

Pharmaceutical drug

Clinical data
- Trade names: Elocta, Eloctate
- Other names: Antihemophilic Factor (Recombinant), FcFusion Protein
- License data: EU EMA: by INN; US DailyMed: Eloctate
- Pregnancy category: AU: C
- Routes of administration: Intravenous
- Drug class: Antihemorrhagic
- ATC code: None

Legal status
- Legal status: AU: Unscheduled; UK: POM (Prescription only); US: ℞-only; EU: Rx-only

Identifiers
- CAS Number: 1270012-79-7
- DrugBank: DB11607
- UNII: 7PCM518YLR
- KEGG: D10830; D10539

Chemical and physical data
- Formula: C_{9736}H_{14863}N_{2591}O_{2855}S_{78}
- Molar mass: 216390.96 g·mol^{−1}

Efmoroctocog alfa, sold under the brand name Elocta among others, is a medication for the treatment and prophylaxis of bleeding in people with hemophilia A. Efmoroctocog alfa is a recombinant human coagulation factor VIII, Fc fusion protein (rFVIIIFc). It is produced by recombinant DNA technology in a human embryonic kidney (HEK) cell line.

It was approved for medical use in the United States in June 2014, and for use in the European Union in November 2015.

== Medical uses ==
In the United States, efmoroctocog alfa (Eloctate) is indicated for adults and children with Hemophilia A for (1) on-demand treatment and control of bleeding episodes, (2) perioperative management, and (3) routine prophylaxis to prevent or reduce the frequency of bleeding episodes.

In the European Union, efmoroctocog alfa (Elocta) is indicated for treatment and prophylaxis of bleeding in people with haemophilia A.
