= LGD-2226 =

Chemical compound

Legal status
- Legal status: US: Investigational New Drug

Identifiers
- IUPAC name: 6-(bis-(2,2,2-trifluoroethyl)amino)-4-trifluoromethyl-1H-quinolin-2-one
- CAS Number: 328947-93-9
- PubChem CID: 11560224
- ChemSpider: 9734998
- UNII: RI376RM5MT
- CompTox Dashboard (EPA): DTXSID10186546
- ECHA InfoCard: 100.230.470

Chemical and physical data
- Formula: C_{14}H_{9}F_{9}N_{2}O
- Molar mass: 392.225 g·mol^{−1}
- 3D model (JSmol): Interactive image
- SMILES: FC(F)(F)c(c2)c1cc(N(CC(F)(F)F)CC(F)(F)F)ccc1[nH]c2=O
- InChI: InChI=1S/C14H9F9N2O/c15-12(16,17)5-25(6-13(18,19)20)7-1-2-10-8(3-7)9(14(21,22)23)4-11(26)24-10/h1-4H,5-6H2,(H,24,26); Key:ULBPQWIGZUGPHU-UHFFFAOYSA-N

LGD-2226 is an investigational selective androgen receptor modulator (SARM), which is being developed for treatment of muscle wasting and osteoporosis.

LGD-2226 is an orally active, potent and selective agonist for androgen receptors which was shown to have anabolic effects in both muscle and bone tissue, but with considerably less effects on prostate weight and luteinizing hormone levels than testosterone.

Selective androgen receptor modulators may also be used by athletes to assist in training and increase physical stamina and fitness, potentially producing effects similar to anabolic steroids but with significantly less side effects. For this reason, SARMs have already been banned by the World Anti-Doping Agency since January 2008 despite no drugs from this class yet being in clinical use, and blood tests for all known SARMs are currently being developed, including LGD-2226.

It was encountered as a novel designer drug by at least 2020.
