= LGD-3303 =

Chemical compound

Clinical data
- Routes of administration: By mouth

Identifiers
- IUPAC name: 9-chloro-2-ethyl-1-methyl-3-(2,2,2-trifluoroethyl)-3H,6H,7H-pyrrolo[3,2-f]quinolin-7-one
- CAS Number: 917891-35-1
- PubChem CID: 25195253
- ChemSpider: 35143239
- UNII: 7N4E1X2RJM
- CompTox Dashboard (EPA): DTXSID601028425

Chemical and physical data
- Formula: C_{16}H_{14}ClF_{3}N_{2}O
- Molar mass: 342.75 g·mol^{−1}
- 3D model (JSmol): Interactive image
- SMILES: CCC1=C(C2=C(N1CC(F)(F)F)C=CC3=C2C(=CC(=O)N3)Cl)C
- InChI: InChI=1S/C16H14ClF3N2O/c1-3-11-8(2)14-12(22(11)7-16(18,19)20)5-4-10-15(14)9(17)6-13(23)21-10/h4-6H,3,7H2,1-2H3,(H,21,23); Key:OMXGOGXEWUCLFI-UHFFFAOYSA-N

LGD-3303 is a drug which acts as a selective androgen receptor modulator (SARM), with good oral bioavailability. It is a selective agonist for the androgen receptor, producing functional selectivity with effective dissociation of anabolic and androgenic effects, acting as a partial agonist for androgenic effects, but a full agonist for anabolic effects. It has been investigated as a possible treatment for osteoporosis, and was shown in animal studies to enhance the effectiveness of a bisphosphonate drug. It was encountered as a novel designer drug by at least 2020.
