= Ligand Pharmaceuticals =

American Pharmaceutical Company

Ligand Pharmaceuticals Incorporated
- Type: Public
- Traded as: Nasdaq: LGND; S&P 600 component
- Industry: Biopharmaceuticals
- Founded: September 1987; 39 years ago
- Founder: Brook Byers
- Headquarters: Jupiter, Florida, U.S.
- Key people: Todd C. Davis (CEO)
- Revenue: US$167.13 million (FY24)
- Number of employees: 68 (2024)
- Website: ligand.com

Ligand Pharmaceuticals is an American biopharmaceutical company that focuses on acquiring and developing royalty-generating assets. As of 2024, the company's portfolio included royalty rights to approximately 90 pharmaceutical products across a range of therapeutic areas. Notable products from which Ligand receives royalties include the multiple myeloma (cancer) treatments Kyprolis and Evomela, the kidney disease therapy Filspari, and the pneumococcal vaccine Vaxneuvance. The company also owns the drug development technology platform Captisol.

The company was founded in 1987 as Progenx by venture capitalist Brook Byers; it was renamed Ligand Pharmaceuticals in 1989 and went public in 1992. Following an accounting scandal that led to its delisting from the Nasdaq stock exchange in 2005 (soon after re-listed), the company underwent a major restructuring. Under former CEO John Higgins, who took over in 2007, Ligand shifted its focus from drug development to its current business model of generating revenue from royalties and licensing payments.

Ligand has grown its portfolio primarily through acquisitions, including Pharmacopeia in 2008, CyDex Pharmaceuticals (the developer of Captisol) in 2011, and Pfenex in 2020. In 2019, the company sold its royalty rights to the drug Promacta for $827 million.

== Business ==
Ligand Pharmaceuticals' business is the acquisition of royalty rights to commercially available and in-development pharmaceutical products. In 2024, the company's portfolio contained approximately 90 therapies and drugs.

Ligand is entitled to royalties on the following products:

- Filspari, a non-immunosuppressive therapy for primary immunoglobulin A nephropathy
- Ohtuvayre, a therapy for chronic obstructive pulmonary disorder
- Capvaxive, a pneumococcal conjugate vaccine
- Qarziba, a treatment for high-risk neuroblastoma
- Zelsuvmi, an at-home treatment for molluscum contagiosum
- Evomela, a high-dose treatment for multiple myeloma
- Kyprolis, a treatment for relapsed or refractory multiple myeloma
- Rylaze, an acute lymphoblastic leukemia therapy
- Teriparatide injection, a treatment for osteoporosis in postmenopausal women
- Vaxneuvance, a vaccine for invasive pneumococcal disease
- Tzield, a therapy for type 1 diabetes
- Pneumosil, a pneumococcal conjugate vaccine
- Nexterone, a treatment for ventricular fibrillation

== History ==
Ligand Pharmaceuticals was founded as Progenx in September 1987 by Brook Byers of the venture capital firm Kleiner Perkins. The company initially focused on developing cancer detection and therapy products based on a monoclonal antibody technology developed by the Scripps Clinic and Johnson & Johnson with partial National Institutes of Health funding. In 1988, the company hired the biotech entrepreneur Howard Birndorf as its president and secured $1.6 million in venture capital financing. Progenx changed its name to Ligand Pharmaceuticals Incorporated in 1989.

=== 1990s ===
In November 1991, Birndorf left Ligand and was replaced by David Robinson. That same year, the company entered into a partnership with Pfizer to develop osteoporosis therapies. This partnership produced lasofoxifene, a drug that as of 2022 was being tested for its ability to slow progression of a metastatic breast cancer.

In 1992, Ligand went public, raising approximately $44 million in its IPO. It also established a pair of joint research programs, one to develop retinoid-based drugs with Allergan and another to research atherosclerosis treatments with Glaxo Wellcome. As part of the latter partnership, Glaxo purchased a six percent stake in Ligand.

In July 1994, Ligand and Abbott Laboratories entered into an agreement to discover ways that Ligand's transcription factor technologies could be used to create drugs for inflammatory diseases.

Ligand partnered with SmithKline Beecham in 1995 to begin work on developing a treatment for a chronic blood-clotting disorder. This research eventually produced the blood platelet-boosting drug Promacta, which was approved by the FDA in 2008.

=== Early 2000s ===
In May 2000, Ligand announced a new partnership with Bristol-Myers Squibb to develop cardiovascular drugs.

In May 2005, Ligand announced that it would restate its 2002 and 2003 financial results, as well as its earnings for the first three quarters of 2004. These accounting irregularities triggered a Securities and Exchange Commission investigation as well as state and federal shareholder lawsuits, and led to the company being delisted from the Nasdaq in September 2005. The SEC investigation ultimately ceased with no charges being filed. In 2006, Ligand shares were relisted on Nasdaq. Ligand paid $12.2 million to settle shareholder lawsuits and agreed to reform its corporate governance by adding three new members to its board.

David Robinson, who was then was president, CEO, and chairman of Ligand's board, stepped down from his position in August 2006. He was replaced by Ligand director Henry F. Blissenbach as interim CEO. John Higgins, a former investment banker took over as permanent CEO in January 2007.Under Blissenbach and Higgins, Ligand sold off commercial operations and reduced staff in an effort to transform itself into a company that would focus on generating revenue from royalty, milestone, and licensing payments secured through its partnerships and research and development work.

In September 2008, Ligand announced that it was acquiring Pharmacopeia for $70 million. One of the drugs yielded from this acquisition is Filspari, which Ligand licensed to Travere Therapeutics and which won FDA approval as a therapy for primary immunoglobulin A nephropathy in September 2024.

In October 2009, Ligand announced that it would acquire Metabasis Therapeutics, a company focused on developing treatments for metabolic and liver diseases. As part of the acquisition, Ligand pledged $8 million of investment toward these development efforts.

=== 2010-present ===
In January 2011, Ligand agreed to acquire CyDex Pharmaceuticals for approximately $35 million. This acquisition gave Ligand access to Captisol, a platform technology useful in drug reformulation. At the time, Captisol was being used in five FDA-approved drugs.

In May 2014, Ligand licensed five novel therapeutic programs to Viking Therapeutics and invested $2.5 million to support the development of treatments for diabetes, cancer cachexia, dyslipidemia, and anemia.

In June 2014, Emmanuel Lemelson, while shorting Ligand stock, published five reports and held several media interviews falsely asserting that Ligand was overvalued, at risk of financial insolvency, and that its hepatitis C drug Promacta was soon going to become obsolete. Following Lemelson's statements, Ligand's market capitalization dropped by $500 million, netting Lemelson $1.3 million. In September 2018, the SEC filed a civil lawsuit against Lemelson in Boston's federal district court, arguing that he made false statements about the state of Ligand's business in order to enrich himself. The jury in the federal court case found that Lemelson had made three false statements in his commentary on Ligand and one of its partner companies, Viking Therapeutics, but that this did not amount to a fraudulent short and distort scheme. In March 2022, Judge Patti B. Saris imposed on Lemelson a $160,000 fine and a five-year injunction barring him from further securities violations.

In November 2016, shareholders of Ligand filed a federal class action lawsuit alleging that the company misled investors about the value of its assets and overall financial outlook. The suit was filed four days after Ligand alerted the SEC that it would be restating several financial reports from 2015.

In July 2018, Ligand was sued by investors, including Citadel, for $3.8 billion, alleging the company unfairly modified its agreements with investors and never filed the amendment with the U.S. Securities and Exchange Commission. A chancery court dismissed the lawsuit and the decision was affirmed by the Delaware Supreme Court in January 2020.

In August 2018, Ligand announced that it would be acquiring Vernalis in a $42 million deal. Through the acquisition, Ligand inherited more than eight research and development partnerships. In March of the following year, Ligand sold its intellectual property rights to Promacta to Royalty Pharma for $827 million.

In August 2020, Ligand announced that it would buy Pfenex, owner of the rights to Merck's Vaxneuvance, Jazz Pharmaceuticals' Rylaze, and Alvogen's teriparatide injection, for $516 million

On December 5, 2022, John Higgins retired as CEO of Ligand and was succeeded by Todd C. Davis.

In September 2023, Ligand spun out its Pelican Technology subsidiary to form the stand-alone biotechnology company Primrose Bio which focused on the development of discovery and manufacturing systems for protein and nucleic acid-based therapies. That same month, Ligand acquired the assets of Novan, a developer of dermatology treatments. This acquisition yielded the molluscum contagiosum treatment Zelsuvmi, which won FDA approval in January 2024.

On July 8, 2024, Ligand acquired Apeiron Biologics, an Austrian firm with the royalty rights to the high-risk neuroblastoma treatment Qarizba.

In April 2026, it was announced that Ligand would acquire Xoma Royalty, an investment firm that focuses on biotechnology companies, for close to $739 million. The acquisition is expected to close in the third quarter of 2026.
