= Heavy isotope diet =

Isotopic food

Chemical structures of ethyl linoleate — natural (top) and its deuterated version 11,11-D_{2}-ethyl linoleate. Protium hydrogen atoms (H) are explicitly shown where they are replaced with deuterium atoms (D).

Heavy isotope diet is the consumption of nutrients in which some atoms are replaced with their heavier non-radioactive isotopes, such as deuterium (^{2}H) or heavy carbon (^{13}C). Biomolecules enriched with heavy isotopes are more stable under certain circumstances, which is thought to increase the resistance to damage associated with ageing or diseases.

Medicines with some hydrogen atoms substituted with deuterium are called deuterated drugs, while substances that are essential nutrients can be used as food constituents, making this food "isotopic". Consumed with food, these nutrients become building material for the body. The examples are deuterated polyunsaturated fatty acids, essential aminoacids, DNA bases such as cytosine, or heavy water and glucose.

== Suggested mechanism ==
One of the most pernicious and irreparable types of oxidative damage inflicted by reactive oxygen species (ROS) upon biomolecules involves carbon-hydrogen bond cleavage (hydrogen abstraction). Intriguingly, the most easily damaged biomolecules belong to the group of essential nutrients (10 out of 20 amino acids; nucleosides at certain conditions (conditionally essential); all polyunsaturated fatty acids). In theory, replacing hydrogen with deuterium "reinforces" the bond due to the kinetic isotope effect, and such reinforced biomolecules taken up by the body will be more resistant to ROS.

== Deuterated omega-6 fatty acids for humans with degenerative diseases ==
Retrotope has pioneered development of omega-6 fatty acid deulinoleate ethyl as a deuterated food additive for the potential treatment of neurodegenerative diseases such as Friedreich’s ataxia and infantile neuroaxonal dystrophy. As of 2018, it has been granted FDA orphan drug designation and passed Phase I/II clinical trials.

== See also ==
- Deuterated drug
- Deulinoleate ethyl
