= Mikhail Shchepinov =

Russian biochemist (born 1965)

Mikhail S. Shchepinov (born 1965, Moscow, USSR) is a biochemist working in bioorganic chemistry, nucleic‑acid microarray technology, and the development of isotope‑reinforced essential nutrients, including deuterated polyunsaturated fatty acids (D‑PUFAs). He is a co‑founder and Chief Scientific Officer of Retrotope, Inc., a biotechnology company developing drug candidates based on the use of stable isotopes to increase the resistance of biomolecules to oxidative damage.

== Early life and education ==
Shchepinov grew up in Chernogolovka, a scientific town north of Moscow. In the late 1970s he was first exposed to autocatalytic processes, by discussing explosions with Nobel laureate Nikolay Semyonov. Shchepinov received an M.S. in chemistry and biotechnology from the D. Mendeleev University of Chemical Technology of Russia and completed a Ph.D. in bioorganic chemistry at the Shemyakin–Ovchinnikov Institute of Bioorganic Chemistry in 1994.

== Academic career ==
From 1995 to 2000, Shchepinov conducted postdoctoral research at the University of Oxford in the laboratory of Sir Edwin Southern, working on DNA chip technology, combinatorial chemistry, fluorescence methods, mass spectrometry, and surface chemistry. His work included the development of nucleic‑acid dendrimers, contributing to early advances in nucleic‑acid microarray platforms.

=== Research contributions ===
Shchepinov has reported that amino acids and nucleic acids can both be reinforced with heavy stable isotopes, with surprising protective effects. The strongest protection has been observed for polyunsaturated lipids, which are an essential part of regular human diet, reinforced by replacement of some hydrogen atoms with deuterium (D‑PUFAs), even at relatively low incorporation levels. This work has contributed to understanding the protective effects of deuterated lipids and the role of lipid oxidation in cell‑death pathways, suggesting that lipid peroxidation may represent a common upstream factor in multiple disorders

== Industry roles ==
After leaving academia, Shchepinov held positions in biotechnology companies including Tridend Technologies. His work in industry involved high‑throughput DNA analysis, chemical tools for genomics and proteomics, and mass‑spectrometry–based multiplexing methods.

=== Isotope‑reinforced therapeutics ===
In 2006, Shchepinov co‑founded Retrotope, Inc., to develop the use of stable isotopes to stabilize essential polyunsaturated fatty acids (PUFA) against lipid peroxidation.

== Publications ==
=== Book ===
Breaking the Chains of Aging (2025) is a popular‑science book by Shchepinov that discusses the role of lipid peroxidation in aging and examines the potential use of D-PUFAs as a therapeutic strategy. The book highlights that lipid peroxidation—despite its involvement in numerous diseases and fundamental aging processes—remains comparatively under‑recognized in mainstream biomedical discourse, and presents the topic for a general readership.
