= Retrotope =

American pharmaceutical company

Retrotope, Inc.
- Founded: 2006
- Legal status: Clinical stage pharmaceutical company
- Headquarters: Los Altos, CA, United States
- Services: Drug development
- President: Anil Kumar
- Chairman of the Board: Rick Winningham
- Chief scientific officer: Mikhail Shchepinov
- Website: www.retrotope.com

Retrotope, Inc. is a drug development company advancing the idea that polyunsaturated fatty acids (PUFA) drugs fortified with heavy isotopes (reinforced lipids) protect living cells by making bonds within the delicate molecules inside and around cells harder to break. This makes the cells less prone to damage caused by reactive oxygen species (ROS), one of the principal causes of ageing and age-associated diseases. Founded in 2006 by entrepreneurs and scientists with seed funding from private investors, Retrotope is developing a non-antioxidant approach to preventing lipid peroxidation, a detrimental factor in mitochondrial, neuronal, and retinal diseases. The company employs the virtual business model and works in scientific collaboration with more than 80 research groups in universities worldwide.

== Development ==
An animated illustration of a chain reaction with slow elements

Retrotope's drug platform, deuterium-stabilized polyunsaturated fatty acids (PUFA), prevents lipid peroxidation damage from propagating, rapidly stopping the toxic chain reaction at its source. Because the fatty acids in mitochondrial and cellular membranes turn over rapidly, the dietary substitution of stabilized fatty acids creates cells fortified against damage due to kinetic isotope effect. 11,11-D2-ethyl linoleate suppresses lipid peroxidation even at relatively low levels of incorporation into membranes. In 2010 Retrotope found that it more than 150 times increases the resistance of the yeast to oxidative stress, later it was shown to be effective in an animal model of Alzheimer's disease. A June 2018 study found that a diet of D-PUFA was shown to significantly decrease F2-isoprostanes (a cerebrospinal fluid found in elevated amounts in Huntington's disease) when fed to one-month old mice over the course of five months. These findings caused discussion in popular science press about the use of deuterated nutrients against ageing, but the most promising direction of further development was toward rare neurodegenerative diseases in which oxidative damage plays a part.

== Clinical trials ==
=== Friedreich's ataxia ===
The first deuterated PUFA made and studied by Retrotope, 11,11-D2-ethyl linoleate, has become the first Retrotope's drug RT001 that was taken into the clinic. It has passed Phase I/II clinical trial for the treatment of Friedreich's ataxia (FA), in which RT001 was shown to be safe, well tolerated and beneficial in terms of improving motor capability in FA patients. However, this preliminary evidence must be interpreted with caution given the limited sample size and the short duration of the study.

=== Phospholipase 2G6-associated neurodegeneration ===
In 2017 FDA granted RT001 orphan drug designation in the treatment of phospholipase 2G6-associated neurodegeneration (PLAN).

=== Infantile neuroaxonal dystrophy ===
A Phase II open-label clinical study for long-term evaluation of efficacy, safety, tolerability, and pharmacokinetics of RT001 in the treatment of infantile neuroaxonal dystrophy started in the Summer 2018.

== Other clinical use ==
=== Amyotrophic lateral sclerosis ===
After a petition for access filed by investigators at major medical centers, in 2018 RT001 was given to a patient with amyotrophic lateral sclerosis (ALS) under a "compassionate use" scheme sponsored by Retrotope.

=== Progressive supranuclear palsy ===
In 2020 FDA granted orphan drug designation RT001 for the treatment of patients with progressive supranuclear palsy (PSP). PSP is a disease involving modification and dysfunction of tau protein; RT001's mechanism of action both lowers lipid peroxidation and prevents mitochondrial cell death of neurons which is associated with disease onset and progression.
