= Reactive =

Reactive may refer to:

- Generally, capable of having a reaction (disambiguation)
- An adjective abbreviation denoting a bowling ball coverstock made of reactive resin
- Reactivity (chemistry)
- Reactive mind
- Reactive programming

== See also ==
- Reactance (disambiguation)
- Reactivity (disambiguation)
