= Reply =

Reply may refer to:

- Reply (linguistics), a response to a question
- Reply (company), an information technology company based in Italy
- Reply Corporation, a defunct computer hardware company based in the United States
- Reply (legal term)
- Reply (Google), a messaging assistance app
- Reply (TV series)

== See also ==
- Response (disambiguation)
- No Reply (disambiguation)
