= Chain reactions in living organisms =

Chain reaction of lipid peroxidation. Clockwise: a polyunsaturated lipid molecule interacts with an external radical and becomes a lipid radical which is further oxidised to a lipid peroxyl radical. The lipid peroxyl radical interacts with another lipid molecule (its neighbour in the membrane) and converts it into a new lipid radical while itself becomes lipid peroxide. This circle continues without additional external radicals present, destroying a large number of lipid molecules in the membrane.

Chain reaction in chemistry and physics is a process that produces products capable of initiating subsequent processes of a similar nature. It is a self-sustaining sequence in which the resulting products continue to propagate further reactions. Examples of chain reactions in living organisms are lipid peroxidation in cell membranes and propagation of excitation of neurons in epilepsy.

== Lipid peroxidation in cell membranes ==
Nonenzymatic peroxidation occurs through the action of reactive oxygen species (ROS), specifically hydroxyl (HO^{•}) and hydroperoxyl (HO^{•}_{2}) radicals, which initiate the oxidation of polyunsaturated fatty acids. Other initiators of lipid peroxidation include ozone (O_{3}), nitrogen oxide (NO), nitrogen dioxide (NO_{2}), and sulfur dioxide. The process of nonenzymatic peroxidation can be divided into three phases: initiation, propagation, and termination.

During the initiation phase, fatty acid radicals are generated, which can propagate peroxidation to other molecules. This occurs when a free radical removes a hydrogen atom from a fatty acid, resulting in a lipid radical (L^{•}) with an unpaired electron.

In the propagation phase, the lipid radical reacts with oxygen (O_{2}) or a transition metal, forming a peroxyl radical (LOO^{•}). This peroxyl radical continues the chain reaction by reacting with a new unsaturated fatty acid, producing a new lipid radical (L^{•}) and lipid hydroperoxide (LOOH). These primary products can further decompose into secondary products.

The termination phase involves the interaction of a radical with an antioxidant molecule, such as α-tocopherol (vitamin E), which inhibits the propagation of chain reactions, thus terminating peroxidation. Another method of termination is the reaction between a lipid radical and a lipid peroxide, or the combination of two lipid peroxide molecules, resulting in stable nonreactive molecules. Reinforced lipids that become part of the membrane if consumed with heavy isotope diet also inhibit peroxidation.

== Propagation of excitation of neurons in epilepsy ==
Epilepsy is a neurological condition marked by recurring seizures. It occurs when the brain's electrical activity becomes unbalanced, leading to repeated seizures. These seizures disrupt the normal electrical patterns in the brain, causing sudden and synchronized bursts of electrical energy. As a result, individuals may experience temporary changes in consciousness, movements, or sensations.

Glutamate excitotoxicity is thought to play an important role in the initiation and maintenance of epileptic seizures. The seizure-induced high flux of glutamate overstimulated glutamate receptors, which triggered a chain reaction of excitation in glutamatergic networks.
