= Nisi prius =

English law term

Nisi prius (/ˈnaɪsaɪ ˈpraɪəs/) (Latin: "unless before") is a historical term in English law. In the 19th century, it came to be used to denote generally all legal actions tried before judges of the King's Bench Division and in the early twentieth century for actions tried at assize by a judge given a commission. Used in that way, the term has had no currency since the abolition of assizes in 1971.

== Trial at nisi prius ==
Trial at nisi prius before the Judicature Act 1873

Before the reforms of the Judicature Act 1873, civil cases at common law were begun in one of the three courts that sat in Westminster Hall: the Court of Common Pleas, Court of Exchequer and King's Bench. Because of their historical origins, these courts were to some extent in competition, especially as their respective judges and officers lived on the fees deriving from them. Given that travel to London was an onerous burden during the medieval period, however, the Statute of Westminster II provided in 1285 for trial of fact in civil cases at the local assizes. Nisi prius translates as "if not sooner" or "if not before" in addition to "unless first": when the action was started in London, the sheriff was ordered to have the jurors there for trial on a certain day "unless before" (nisi prius) that day the case was heard at assize in the claimant's county. After trial at the assizes, the case could be referred back to the original court, from where there was a possibility of further appeal to the Court of Exchequer Chamber.

After the reform of the common law courts in 1873, actions were only said to be tried at nisi prius, and a judge said to sit at nisi prius, when he sat, usually in the King's Bench Division, for the trial of actions. By a resolution passed by the judges of the King's Bench Division in 1894 it was declared of the utmost importance that there should be at least three courts of nisi prius sitting continuously throughout the legal year: one for special jury causes, one for common jury causes, and one for causes without juries.

== Nisi prius record ==
The nisi prius record was, before the Judicature Acts, the name of the formal copy of proceedings showing the history of the case up to the time of trial. After the trial it was endorsed with the postea, showing the result of the trial, and delivered by the officer of the court to the successful party, whose possession of the postea was his title to judgment. Since the Judicature Acts there is no nisi prius record in civil actions, the nearest approach to it being the deposit of copies of the statements of case for the use of the judge, and there is no postea, the certificate of the associate or master as to the result of the trial superseding it.

== Cultural references ==
Nisi prius is mentioned in the Gilbert and Sullivan comic opera The Mikado, in the song "As Some Day it May Happen" in a list of items that "won't be missed": "And that Nisi Prius nuisance, who just now is rather rife, the judicial humorist—I've got him on the list!"

== Bibliography ==
- Cornish, W. R. & Clark, G. de N. (1989). Law and Society in England 1750-1950. London: Sweet & Maxwell. pp. 23–26, 75. ISBN 0-421-31150-9.
- Curzon, L. B. (2002). Dictionary of Law (6th ed.). London: Longman. p. p. 287 nisi prius. ISBN 0-582-43809-8.
- Glesson, T. (2006). "Curtmantle - the common law king". Justice of the Peace. 170: 171.
