= Reaction =

Reaction may refer to a process or to a response to an action, event, or exposure.

== Physics and chemistry ==
- Chemical reaction
- Nuclear reaction
- Reaction (physics), as defined by Newton's third law
- Chain reaction (disambiguation)

== Biology and medicine ==
- Adverse drug reaction
- Allergic reaction
- Reflex, neural reaction
- Hypersensitivity, immune reaction
- Intolerance (disambiguation)
- Light reaction (disambiguation)

== Psychology ==
- Emotional, reaction
- Reactivity
- Proactivity, opposite of reactive behaviour
- Reactive attachment disorder

== Politics and culture ==
- Reactionary, a political tendency
- Reaction video
- Commentary (disambiguation)

== Proper names and titles ==
- Reaction (album), a 1986 album by American R&B singer Rebbie Jackson
  - "Reaction" (song), the title song from the Rebbie Jackson album
- "Reaction", a single by Dead Letter Circus
- Reactions, a 2018 album by The Mods
- ReAction GUI, a GUI toolkit used on AmigaOS
- Reaction.life, a political news and commentary website edited by Iain Martin
- Reaction Records, a record label
- TNA Reaction, a former documentary show of TNA Wrestling (now known as Impact Wrestling) behind the scenes
- Reaction (The Spectacular Spider-Man), an episode of the American animated television series The Spectacular Spider-Man
- The Reaction, a novel in the Animorphs series
- Reactions (journal), a chemistry journal published by MDPI

== See also ==
- Action (disambiguation)
- Stimulus (disambiguation)
- Thermidorian Reaction
