= Chain reaction (disambiguation) =

A chain reaction in chemistry or physics is a sequence of reactions where a reactive product or by-product causes additional reactions to take place.

Chain reaction or The Chain reaction may also refer to:

== Media ==
- Chain Reaction (game show), an American game show
- Chain Reaction (radio), a BBC Radio 4 chat show
- "Chain Reaction" (Falcon Crest), a 1987 TV episode
- "Chain Reaction" (Missing You), a 2025 TV episode
- "Chain Reaction" (Stargate SG-1), a TV series episode
- Chain Reaction, a novel by Simone Elkeles
- Chain Reaction, a 1995 video game in the Magical Drop series

== Films ==
- Chain Reaction (1996 film), starring Keanu Reeves, Rachel Weisz, Morgan Freeman, and Fred Ward
- Chain Reaction (2017 film), a Polish drama film
- The Chain Reaction, 1980 Australian film starring Steve Bisley

== Music ==
- Chain Reaction (band)
- Chain Reaction (record label)
- Chain Reaction (music venue), defunct music venue in Anaheim, California

=== Albums ===
- Chain Reaction (The Crusaders album), 1975
- Chain Reaction (Luba album), 1980
- Chain Reaction (John Farnham album), 1990
- Chain Reaction (Cuban Link album), 2005
- Chain Reaction: Yokohama Concert, Vol. 2, a 1977 concert recording by J. J. Johnson and Nat Adderley released in 2002
- Chain Reaction, a 2014 album by Distorted Harmony

=== Songs ===
- "Chain Reaction" (Diana Ross song), 1985
- "Chain Reaction" (John Farnham song), 1990
- "Chain Reaction", from the album The Best by Girls' Generation
- "Chain Reaction", from the 1974 album Soon Over Babaluma by Can
- "Chain Reaction", from the 1983 album Frontiers by Journey
- "Chain Reaction", from the 1985 album Straight No Filter by Hank Mobley
- "Chain Reaction", from the 1988 album Reach for the Sky by Ratt

== Other uses ==
- Chain Reaction (horse), a Canadian racehorse
- Chain Reaction (sculpture), a 1991 American peace monument created by Paul Conrad
- Chain Reaction Cycles, a retail website focusing on selling cycling goods

== See also ==
- Nuclear chain reaction, a physical process
- Chain Reactions (film), a 2024 documentary film
- Chain reactions in living organisms
- Chain of events
