= Special pleader =

Historical legal occupation

A special pleader was a historical legal occupation. The practitioner, or "special pleader" in English law specialised in drafting "pleadings", in modern terminology statements of case.

== History ==
Up to the 19th century, there were many rules, technicalities and difficulties in drafting pleadings and claims and defences could be dismissed for trivial errors. As an extreme instance, a learned judge in the 19th century challenged a pleading for putting the year without adding A.D., on the ground that "non constat that A.C. might not be intended".

Some practitioners made it their business to frame pleadings, rather than to appear in court or to write legal opinions, and were called special pleaders. They were not necessarily barristers, but might be licensed to practise under the bar. At one time it was usual to practise for a time as a special pleader before being called to the bar.

The Common Law Procedure Acts of 1852 and 1854 doomed the profession by simplifying pleadings. Their numbers accordingly quickly declined, from 74 in 1850 to 19 in 1860. A few lingered into the beginning of the 20th century.

The system had largely fallen into disuse as a speciality by the beginning of the 20th century, although it continues to exist in India.
