= Isotope effect on lipid peroxidation =

Diagram of the structure of a lipid bilayer. The lipids with incorporating unsaturated fatty acids (blue) increase the fluidity of membranes compared to membranes made of only saturated fatty acids (black).

Kinetic isotope effect is observed when molecules containing heavier isotopes of the same elements (for example, deuterium for hydrogen) engage in a chemical reaction at a slower rate. Deuterium-reinforced lipids can be used for protecting living cells by slowing the chain reaction of lipid peroxidation. The lipid bilayer of the cell and organelle membranes contain polyunsaturated fatty acids (PUFA) are key components of cell and organelle membranes. Any process that either increases oxidation of PUFAs or hinders their ability to be replaced can lead to serious disease. Correspondingly, drugs that stop the chain reaction of lipid peroxidation have preventive and therapeutic potential.

== Mechanism of isotope effect in general ==
The three most stable isotopes of hydrogen, all having the same number of protons (1) and different mass due to different number of neutrons: protium (mass = 1, stable), deuterium (mass = 2, stable), and tritium (mass = 3, radioactive).

The mass of the atoms forming a chemical bond affects the bond’s strength. When two different isotopes of the same element exist, the heavier ones form stronger bonds. Stronger bonds make bond cleavage reactions run more slowly, leading to the kinetic isotope effect (KIE), a well-studied concept in physical chemistry. To illustrate this with an example from soccer, if one of the two identical soccer balls is filled up with air and another one with water, they will look identical on the ground, but a stronger kick would be required to send the water-filled ball the same distance as the air-filled one. Of the two stable isotopes of hydrogen (H), deuterium (^{2}H) is twice as heavy as protium (^{1}H), giving the largest kinetic isotope effect of all stable (non-radioactive) atoms.

The KIE is sometimes applied in another context in drug development, modulating drug properties in a favorable/patient-friendly way (deuterated drugs). Small molecules used as drugs are recognized as “foreign” to the body, and an organism’s defense systems often mount a response. Typically, drug metabolism alters the drug molecule through oxidation into derivatives that are easier to excrete, reducing the drug’s half-life. This can be slowed down by deuteration, hence improving pharmacokinetics and pharmacodynamics.

== Mechanism of isotope effect on lipid peroxidation ==
An animated model of a chain reaction with slow, oxidation-resistant elements

PUFAs are highly prone to oxidative damage through a purely chemical, non-enzymatic chain reaction. With tight packaging of PUFAs in membranes, the oxidation of a single PUFA molecule rapidly leads to a chain reaction resulting in oxidation of hundreds to thousands of adjacent PUFA molecules. Cell and organelle membranes contain small quantities of antioxidants such as vitamin E, and enact complex mechanisms to delete and replace oxidized PUFAs to maintain normal membrane function. However, in certain disease states, the natural PUFA maintenance system is not able to cope with disease-related increased levels of oxidation or decreased levels of repair. Once a PUFA molecule has been oxidized it is irreversibly damaged and must be removed from the membrane and excreted.

One method to reduce the rate of PUFA oxidation is to replace a portion of the dietary PUFAs with reinforced PUFAs of identical chemical structure to natural PUFA, but more resistant to oxidation. Those hydrogen atoms that are most prone to oxidation are replaced with deuterium atoms. This change has no discernible impact on the normal biochemical properties of D-PUFAs – their distribution within the human body remains unchanged, they undergo all the normal enzyme catalysed PUFA reactions, they function normally in all cell and organelle membranes, but once the levels of these D-PUFAs in various membranes reach a concentration of about 15-20%, all non-enzymatic chain oxidation stops including that of the normal, nondeuterated PUFAs. The result is the stabilization of cell membranes, even in the face of excess oxidative stress or diminished membrane repair, such as those elicited by disease states.

== Biological and clinical significance ==
Several biomolecules, including PUFAs and some amino acids, cannot be made by human beings and must be supplied in the diet. These molecules are termed “essential dietary components” and serve as building blocks that are incorporated into larger structures such as proteins and cell membranes. PUFA membrane components are particularly vulnerable to damage (oxidation) by reactive oxygen species (ROS) as part of both normal and pathological metabolism. Unlike catabolic oxidation of drugs, or oxidative damage to DNA or proteins (which occurs stoichiometrically), oxidation of PUFAs is particularly pernicious, proceeding through a non-enzymatic lipid peroxidation chain reaction (LPO), whereby a single ROS species can initiate a runaway autoxidation process that does not need any additional ROS to propagate.

LPO may damage hundreds to thousands of PUFA residues in PUFA-rich neuronal, mitochondrial and retinal membranes. The chain oxidation proceeds inexorably through multiple steps, destroying lipid membranes and generating highly reactive toxic secondary products that damage numerous biomolecules, such as proteins and DNA, irreversibly. This makes LPO one of the most detrimental processes that occur in the body. LPO is not controlled by enzymes, so evolution could not have provided a straightforward solution. Antioxidants cannot efficiently stop the incipient chain reaction because their maximal achievable concentration in lipid membranes is orders of magnitude lower than the PUFA concentration (typically, 1 tocopherol moiety per 2000 PUFA residues in a bilayer). Numerous neuronal and retinal diseases have LPO in their etiology. To put things in perspective, the brain makes up 1.5–2% of body weight yet consumes about a fifth of the body’s total energy output. A quarter of this 20%, i.e. 5% of the total body energy expenditure, is used by the brain to recycle damaged lipids in neuronal membranes.

== Verification of the effect in vivo (animal research) ==
The concept of using D-PUFAs to inhibit LPO has been tested in numerous cell and animal models, including:

- Parkinson's disease (MPTP and a-Syn models in mice and rats)
- Huntington's disease (in mice)
- Alzheimer's disease (APP/PS1 and ALDH2 mouse models)
- Diabetic retinopathy (Akita mice)
- Age-related macular degeneration (light irradiation in rats, eye iron overload in mice)
- Atherosclerosis (Leiden mice)

== Drugs using the isotope effect on lipid peroxidation (clinical research) ==
The D-PUFAs are currently undergoing clinical trials in several human indications.

In general, reinforced by deuterium polyunsaturated fatty acids (D-PUFA) drugs:

- are deuterated forms of natural, essential PUFAs, identical to natural PUFAs bar one key property: D-PUFAs are significantly more resistant to lipid peroxidation;
- are chemically modified (novel chemical entity), but transported, processed and incorporated into membranes “naturally” by the body. Deuterium is naturally present in all humans, so ^{2}H in place of ^{1}H is recognized by the body as a “normal” hydrogen subtype;
- stop the chain reaction through a novel non-antioxidant mechanism at low, easily attainable levels, with no overt toxicity-related side effects.
- are delivered orally. PUFAs are essential nutrients, so the body avidly takes up dosed D-PUFA drugs, building up a therapeutic level in a matter of weeks;
- Favorably modulate important pathways such as ferroptosis, by inhibiting lipid peroxidation.

== See also ==
- Urey–Bigeleisen–Mayer equation
