= Response =

Response may refer to:

- Call and response (music), musical structure
- Reaction (disambiguation)
- Request–response
  - Output or response, the result of telecommunications input
- Response (liturgy), a line answering a versicle
- Response (music) or antiphon, a response to a psalm or other part of a religious service
- Response, a phase in emergency management
- Response rate (survey)

== Proper names and titles ==
- Response, a print and online magazine of Christian thought published by Seattle Pacific University
- Response (album), a studio album by Phil Wickham
- Response (company), a call centre company based in Scotland
- The Response (film)
- The National War Memorial (Canada), titled The Response
- The Northumberland Fusiliers Memorial in Newcastle upon Tyne, titled "The Response"

== See also ==
- Action (disambiguation)
- Answer (disambiguation)
- Reply (disambiguation)
- Response variable, or the realization thereof
- Responsions, an examination formerly required for a degree at Oxford University
- Stimulus (disambiguation), evokes a response
- Stimulus–response model, in statistics
- Transient response (electrical and mechanical engineering)
