= Reactivity =

Reactivity may refer to:

- Reactivity (chemistry), the rate at which a chemical substance tends to undergo a chemical reaction
- Reactive programming, a property of an execution model whereby changes are automatically propagated through a dataflow network
- Reactivity (psychology)
- Reactivity (electronics)
- Reactivity in nuclear reactions measures the nuclear chain reaction rate in nuclear reactors and nuclear weapons

== See also ==
- Reactive (disambiguation)
- Reactance (disambiguation)
