= Deuterium NMR =

Type of nuclear magnetic resonance spectroscopy

Deuterium NMR is NMR spectroscopy of deuterium (^{2}H or D), an isotope of hydrogen. Deuterium is an isotope with spin = 1, unlike hydrogen-1, which has spin = 1/2. The term deuteron NMR, in direct analogy to proton NMR, is also used. Deuterium NMR has a range of chemical shift similar to proton NMR but with poor resolution, due to the smaller magnitude of the magnetic dipole moment of the deuteron relative to the proton. It may be used to verify the effectiveness of chemical reactions that install deuterium atoms on a structure: a deuterated compound will show a strong peak in the ^{2}H-NMR spectrum. If the reaction involves replacement of an existing proton, the structurally analogous signal in the ^{1}H-NMR spectrum will be smaller.

^{2}H-NMR spectra are especially informative in the solid state because of its relatively small quadrupole moment in comparison with those of bigger quadrupolar nuclei such as chlorine-35. This allows for the whole spectrum to be excited with practically achievable pulses of a few microseconds in duration. However, since the natural abundance of ^{2}H is only 0.016%, the sample must usually be ^{2}H-enriched to achieve a strong enough signal. For a given C-D moiety, the quadrupolar splitting in the ^{2}H-NMR spectrum depends in a simple way on the angle between the C-D bond and the applied static magnetic field. Thus, ^{2}H-NMR can probe orientation distributions in partially ordered deuterated polymers. Changes in C-D bond orientation due to molecular motions have pronounced effects on the spectral line shape. One example is the use of ^{2}H-NMR to study lipid membrane phase behavior.
