= Deuterated drug =

Class of pharmaceutical drug

Chemical structures of ethyl linoleate — natural (top) and its deuterated version 11,11-D_{2}-ethyl linoleate. Protium hydrogen atoms (H) are explicitly shown where they are replaced with deuterium atoms (D).

A deuterated drug is a small molecule medicinal product in which one or more of the hydrogen atoms in the drug molecule have been replaced by the heavier stable isotope deuterium. Because of the kinetic isotope effect, deuterium-containing drugs may have significantly lower rates of metabolism, and hence a longer half-life, than their non-deuterated isotopologs.

== Mode of action ==
Hydrogen is a chemical element with an atomic number of 1. Its most common isotope, sometimes called "protium", has one proton and one electron. Deuterium, often indicated by the symbol D, is the heavier naturally occurring stable isotope of hydrogen. Deuterium was discovered by Harold Urey in 1931, for which he received the Nobel Prize in 1934. The deuterium isotope effect has become an important tool in the elucidation of the mechanism of chemical reactions. Deuterium contains one proton, one electron, and additionally one neutron, effectively doubling the mass of the hydrogen atom without changing its properties significantly. However, the carbon–deuterium (C–D) bond is slightly shorter, and it has reduced electronic polarizability and less hyperconjugative stabilization of adjacent bonds, including developing an anti-bonding orbital as part of the newly formed bond. This can potentially result in weaker van der Waals stabilization, and can produce other changes in molecular properties that are difficult to predict, including changes in the intramolecular volume and the transition state volume. Substituting deuterium for hydrogen yields "deuterated" compounds that are similar in size and shape to hydrogen-based compounds.

== History ==
The concept of replacing protium with deuterium is an example of bioisosterism, whereby similar biological effects to a known drug are produced in an analog designed to confer superior properties. The first patent granted in the US for deuterated molecules was in the 1970s. Since then, patents on deuterated drugs have become more common. Biochemist and inventor Anthony Czarnik holds multiple patents for using deuterium substitution in drug discovery.

The applications of the deuterium isotope effect have increased over time, and it is now applied extensively in mechanistic studies of the metabolism of drugs as well as in other studies focused on pharmacokinetics (PK), efficacy, tolerability, bioavailability, and safety. The introduction of deuterated drug candidates that began in the 1970s evolved from earlier work with deuterated metabolites. However, it took more than 40 years for the first deuterated drug, Austedo® (deutetrabenazine), to be approved by the FDA in the US. Czarnik has invented drugs such as (R)-d1-lenalidomide and (R)-d1-pioglitazone for clinical studies.

Numerous publications have discussed the advantages and disadvantages of deuterated drugs. A number of publications have discussed aspects of intellectual property of deuterated versions of drugs.

== Examples ==
Deutetrabenazine is a deuterated version of tetrabenazine. It was developed by Auspex, then acquired by Teva in 2015 and approved by the FDA in 2017 as a treatment for chorea associated with Huntington's disease. It has a longer half-life than the non-deuterated form of tetrabenazine, which had been approved earlier for the same use.

Deucravacitinib is a deuterated JAK inhibitor (specifically, TYK2 inhibitor) approved for the treatment of plaque psoriasis.

Concert Pharmaceuticals focuses on deuterated drugs for various conditions. Concert was acquired by Sun Pharma in March 2023.

Deutivacaftor is a deuterated version of ivacaftor, developed by Concert and acquired by Vertex Pharmaceuticals, which originally developed and marketed ivacaftor for the treatment of cystic fibrosis. Deutivacaftor is approved for the same indication, in combination with tezacaftor and vanzacaftor.

The company Retrotope discovered and has been developing a deuterated fatty acid RT001 as a treatment for neurodegenerative diseases such as Friedreich's ataxia and infantile neuroaxonal dystrophy. Their premise is that fatty acids in cell membranes are a source of reactive oxygen species and deuterated versions will be less prone to generating them.

Poxel SA, a French clinical-stage biopharmaceutical company focused on therapies for rare metabolic diseases, is developing PXL065 to target nonalcoholic steatohepatitis (NASH). The company acquired PXL065 (the deuterium-stabilized (R)-enantiomer of pioglitazone) and a portfolio of deuterated thiazolidinediones (TZDs) from DeuteRx LLC in 2018, and published positive results from the Phase 2 trial in March 2023.

Compound	Status	Beneficial deuterium effect
Austedo (deutetrabenazine) (SD-809)	Approved	Reduces formation of toxic metabolite by CYP2D6
Deutivacaftor (formerly CTP-656, VX-561) (d9-ivacaftor)	Approved	Reduces rate of tert-Bu group oxidation and in vivo clearance by CYP3A4
ALK-001 (d3-vitamin A)	Phase 3	Slows the dimerization rate of vitamin A
AVP-786 (d6-dextromethorphan)	Phase 3	Reduces formation of toxic metabolite by CYP2D6
VX-984 (novel cancer agent)	Phase 1	Reduces aldehyde oxidase-driven metabolism
PXL065 (formerly DRX-065) (d1-(R)-pioglitazone)	Phase 2	Stabilizes preferred R-enantiomer to obtain mitochondrial function modulation without peroxisome proliferator-activated receptor gamma (PPARγ) agonist activity (due to S-pioglitazone)
RT001 (d2-linoleic acid ethyl ester)	Phase 1/2	Limits lipid peroxidation
SP-3164 (formerly DRX-164) (d-(S)-avadomide)	Preclinical	Stabilizes preferred S-enantiomer for increased cereblon (CRBN) binding affinity
Fludalanine (MK-0641)	Discontinued	Reduces toxic metabolite, 3-fluorolactate

== See also ==
- Reinforced lipids
