= Statement of case =

A statement of case is any of a number of formal documents used in the courts of England and Wales under the Civil Procedure Rules (or CPR). The Claim Form (which may also include summary or all the particulars of claim), Defence and Response are all statements of case.

The term "pleadings" continues to be used, though incorrectly, to refer to statements of case, the preferred terminology used by the Civil Procedure Rules.

== See also ==
- Civil procedure in England and Wales
