= Reinforced lipids =

Deuterated lipid molecules

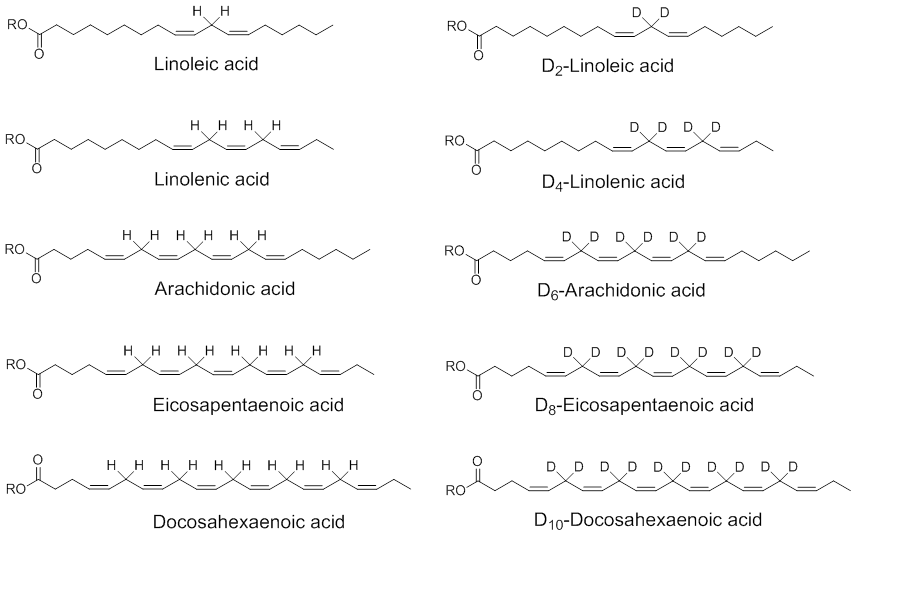
Polyunsaturated fatty acids (PUFA), normal and deuterated, for the synthesis of reinforced lipids. Hydrogen atoms (H) are explicitly shown where they are replaced with deuterium (D), at oxidation-prone bis-allylic (between double bonds) positions. "R" stands for "radical", for example, hydrogen or ester.

Reinforced lipids are lipid molecules in which some of the fatty acids contain deuterium next to the double bonds. They can be used for the protection of living cells by slowing the chain reaction due to isotope effect on lipid peroxidation. The lipid bilayer of the cell and organelle membranes contain polyunsaturated fatty acids (PUFA) are key components of cell and organelle membranes. Any process that either increases oxidation of PUFAs or hinders their ability to be replaced can lead to serious disease. Correspondingly, use of reinforced lipids that stop the chain reaction of lipid peroxidation has preventive and therapeutic potential.

== Examples of reinforced lipids ==
There are a number of polyunsaturated fatty acids that can be reinforced by deuteration. They include (the names of the reinforced deuterated versions are separated by a slash):

- linoleic acid / D_{2}-linoleic acid (D2-Lin)
- α-linolenic acid / D_{4}-α-linolenic acid (D4-Lnn)
- arachidonic acid / D_{6}-arachidonic acid (D6-ARA)
- eicosapentaenoic acid / D_{8}-eicosapentaenoic acid (D8-EPA)
- docosahexaenoic acid / D_{10}-docosahexaenoic acid (D10-DHA)

== Mechanism of action ==
Hydrogen is a chemical element with atomic number 1. It has just one proton and one electron. Deuterium is the heavier naturally occurring, stable isotope of hydrogen. Deuterium contains one proton, one electron, and a neutron, doubling the mass without changing its properties significantly. Substituting deuterium for hydrogen yields deuterated compounds that are similar in size and shape to normal hydrogen compounds.

One of the most pernicious and irreparable types of oxidative damage inflicted by reactive oxygen species (ROS) upon biomolecules involves the carbon-hydrogen bond cleavage (hydrogen abstraction). In theory, replacing hydrogen with deuterium "reinforces" the bond due to the kinetic isotope effect, and such reinforced biomolecules taken up by the body will be more resistant to ROS.

The deuterium-reinforced lipids resists the non-enzymatic lipid peroxidation (LPO) through isotope effect — a non-antioxidant based mechanism that protects mitochondrial, neuronal and other lipid membranes, thereby greatly reducing the levels of numerous LPO-derived toxic products such as reactive carbonyls.

Treating cells with deuterium-containing PUFAs (D-PUFAs) can prevent of ferroptosis. This treatment stops the autoxidation process through the kinetic isotope effect (KIE), as shown in Table 1 [66]. The efficacy of D-PUFAs in preventing ferroptosis has been demonstrated in models induced by erastin and RSL3, and has shown promising results in various disease models, especially those related to neurodegenerative disorders.

== Laboratory and animal research ==
The concept of using reinforced lipids to inhibit lipid peroxidation has been tested in numerous cell and animal models, including:

- Parkinson's disease (MPTP and a-Syn models in mice and rats)
- Huntington's disease (in mice)
- Alzheimer's disease (APP/PS1 and ALDH2 mouse models)
- Diabetic retinopathy (Akita mice)
- Age-related macular degeneration (light irradiation in rats, eye iron overload in mice)
- Atherosclerosis (Leiden mice)

== Clinical research ==
=== Friedreich's ataxia ===
A double-blind comparator-controlled Phase I/II clinical trial of using D_{2}-linoleic acid ethyl ester (RT001) for Friedreich's ataxia, sponsored by Retrotope and Friedreich's Ataxia Research Alliance, was conducted to determine the safety profile and appropriate dosing for consequent trials. RT001 was promptly absorbed and was found to be safe and tolerable over 28 days at the maximal dose of 9 g/day. It improved peak workload and peak oxygen consumption in the test group compared to the control group who received the equal doses of normal, non-deuterated linoleic acid ethyl ester. Another randomised, double-blind, placebo-controlled clinical study began in 2019.

=== Infantile neuroaxonal dystrophy ===
An open-label clinical study for infantile neuroaxonal dystrophy evaluating long-term evaluation of efficacy, safety, tolerability, and pharmacokinetics of RT001, which, when taken with food, can protect the neuronal cells from degeneration, started in the Summer 2018.

=== Phospholipase 2G6-associated neurodegeneration ===
In 2017, the FDA granted RT001 orphan drug designation in the treatment of phospholipase 2G6-associated neurodegeneration (PLAN).

=== Amyotrophic lateral sclerosis ===
In 2018, RT001 was given to a patient with amyotrophic lateral sclerosis (ALS) under a "compassionate use scheme".

=== Progressive supranuclear palsy ===
In 2020, the FDA granted orphan drug designation RT001 for the treatment of patients with progressive supranuclear palsy (PSP). PSP is a disease involving modification and dysfunction of tau protein; RT001's mechanism of action both lowers lipid peroxidation and prevents mitochondrial cell death of neurons which is associated with disease onset and progression.
