= Light reaction =

Light reaction may refer to:

- Light-dependent reactions
- Pupillary light reflex
