= Reactance =

Reactance may refer to:

- Electrical reactance, the opposition to a change in voltage due to capacitance (capacitive reactance) or in current due to inductance (inductive reactance); the imaginary component of AC impedance
- Magnetic reactance, a similar effect in magnetism
- Reactance (psychology), an emotional reaction to pressure or persuasion that results in the strengthening or adoption of a contrary belief

== See also ==
- Reactants, chemical reagents
- Reactivity (disambiguation)
