= No Reply =

No Reply may refer to:

- No Reply (album), by Daylight Dies
- "No Reply" (song), by the Beatles
- "No Reply", a song by Buzzcocks from Another Music in a Different Kitchen
- "No Reply", a song by Tame Impala from the album Deadbeat (2025)
