= Deuterium =

Isotope of hydrogen with one neutron

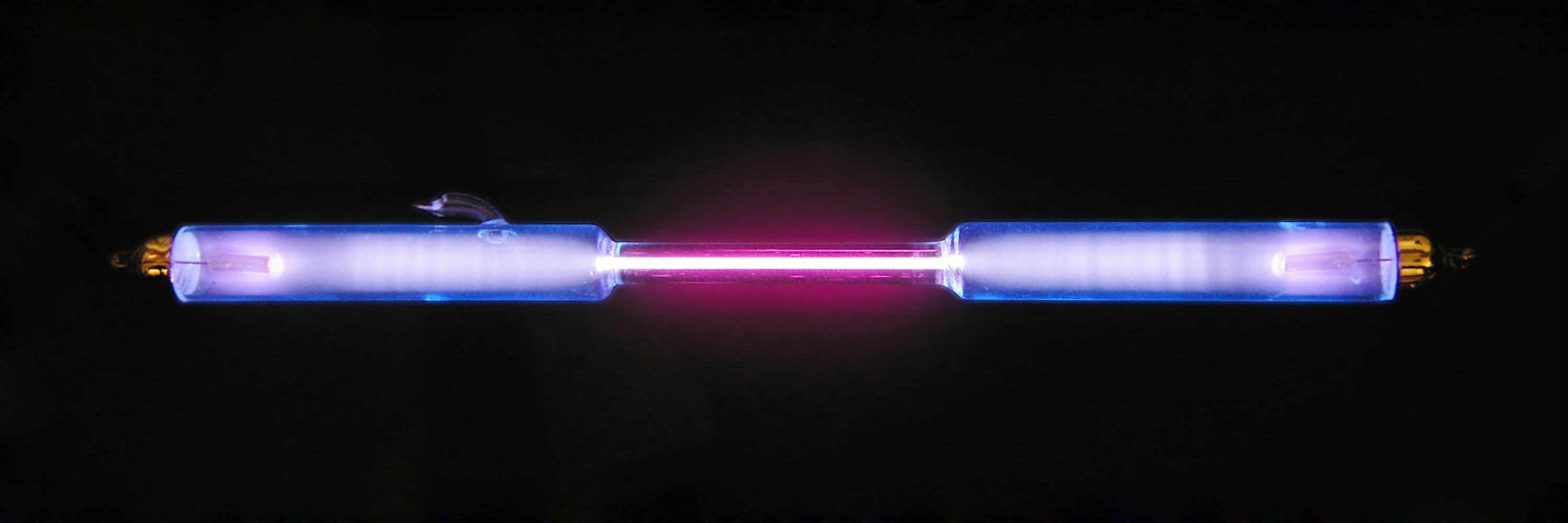
- Deuterium glowing in a gas discharge tube

General
- Symbol: ^{2}H
- Names: Deuterium, hydrogen-2
- Protons (Z): 1
- Neutrons (N): 1

Nuclide data
- Natural abundance: 0.0156% (Earth)
- Half-life (t_{1/2}): stable
- Isotope mass: 2.0141017778 Da
- Spin: 1^{+}
- Excess energy: 13135.720±0.001 keV
- Nuclear binding energy: 2224.57±0.20 keV

Deuterium (hydrogen-2, symbol ^{2}H or D, also known as heavy hydrogen) is one of two stable isotopes of hydrogen; the other is protium, or hydrogen-1, ^{1}H. The deuterium nucleus (deuteron) contains one proton and one neutron, whereas the far more common ^{1}H has no neutrons.

The name deuterium comes from Greek deuteros, meaning "second". American chemist Harold Urey discovered deuterium in 1931. Urey and others produced samples of heavy water in which the ^{2}H had been highly concentrated. The discovery of deuterium won Urey a Nobel Prize in 1934.

Nearly all deuterium found in nature was synthesized in the Big Bang 13.8 billion years ago, forming the primordial ratio of ^{2}H to ^{1}H (~26 deuterium nuclei per 10^{6} hydrogen nuclei). Deuterium is subsequently produced by the slow stellar proton–proton chain, but rapidly destroyed by exothermic fusion reactions. The deuterium–deuterium reaction has the second-lowest energy threshold, and is the most astrophysically accessible, occurring in both stars and brown dwarfs.

The gas giant planets display the primordial ratio of deuterium. Comets show an elevated ratio similar to Earth's oceans (156 deuterium nuclei per 10^{6} hydrogen nuclei). This reinforces theories that much of Earth's ocean water is of cometary origin. The deuterium ratio of comet 67P/Churyumov–Gerasimenko, as measured by the Rosetta space probe, is about three times that of Earth water. This figure is the highest yet measured in a comet, thus deuterium ratios continue to be an active topic of research in both astronomy and climatology.

Deuterium is used in most thermonuclear weapons, many fusion power experiments, and as the most effective neutron moderator, primarily in heavy water nuclear reactors. It is also used as an isotopic label, in biogeochemistry, NMR spectroscopy, and deuterated drugs.

== Differences from common hydrogen (protium) ==
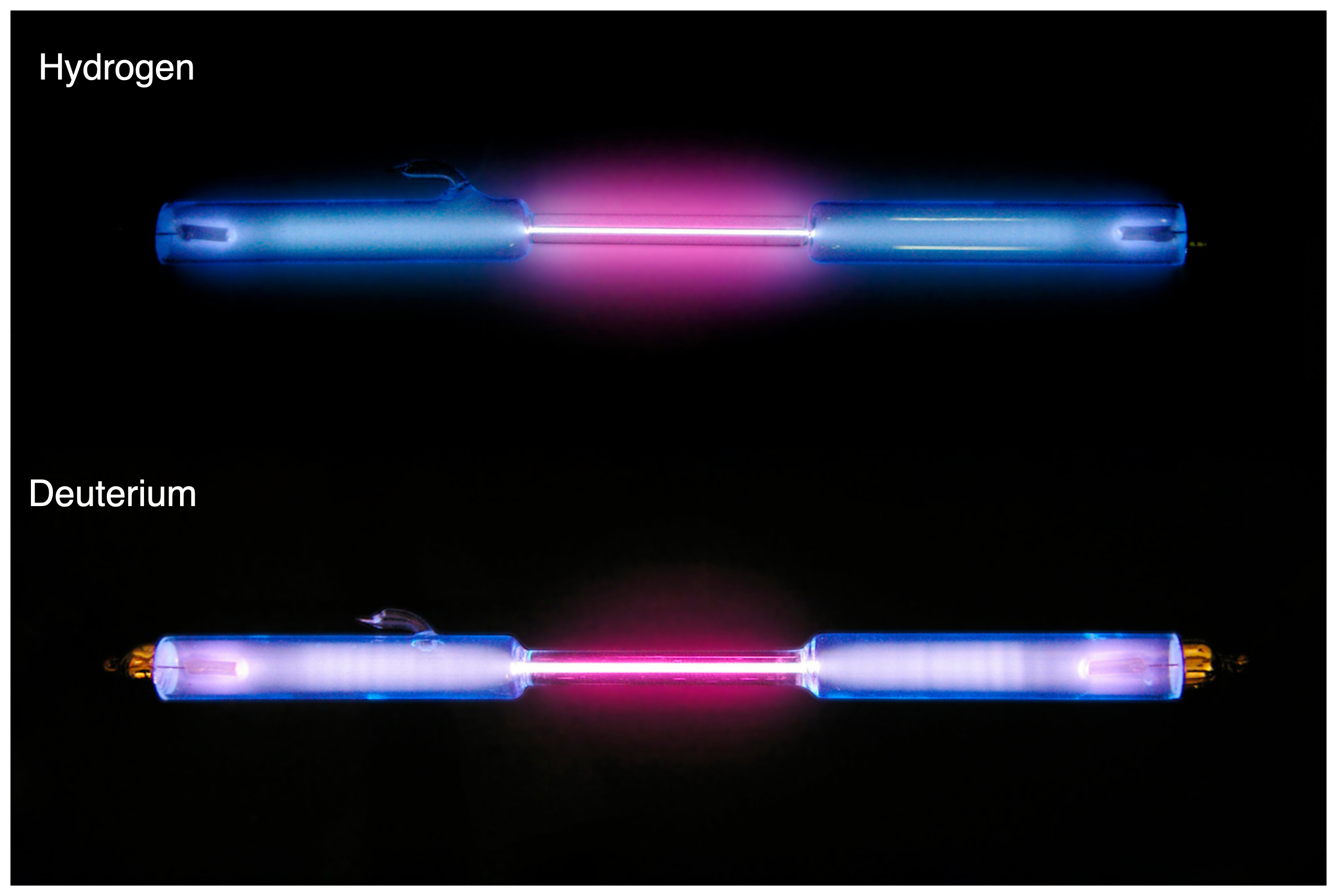
Hydrogen (above) and deuterium (below) glowing in gas discharge tubes

=== Chemical symbol ===
Deuterium is often represented by the chemical symbol D. Since it is an isotope of hydrogen with mass number 2, it is also represented by ^{2}H. IUPAC allows both D and ^{2}H, though ^{2}H is preferred. A distinct chemical symbol is used for convenience because of the isotope's common use in various scientific processes. Also, its large mass difference with protium (^{1}H) confers non-negligible chemical differences with ^{1}H compounds. Deuterium has a mass of 2.014102 Da, about twice the mean hydrogen atomic weight of 1.007947 Da, or twice protium's mass of 1.007825 Da. The isotope weight ratios within other elements are largely insignificant in this regard.

=== Spectroscopy ===
In quantum mechanics, the energy levels of electrons in atoms depend on the reduced mass of the system of electron and nucleus. For a hydrogen atom, the role of reduced mass is most simply seen in the Bohr model of the atom, where the reduced mass appears in a simple calculation of the Rydberg constant and Rydberg equation, but the reduced mass also appears in the Schrödinger equation, and the Dirac equation for calculating atomic energy levels.

The reduced mass of the system in these equations is close to the mass of a single electron, but differs from it by a small amount about equal to the ratio of mass of the electron to the nucleus. For ^{1}H, this amount is about 1837/1836, or 1.000545, and for ^{2}H it is even smaller: 3671/3670, or 1.000272. The energies of electronic spectra lines for ^{2}H and ^{1}H therefore differ by the ratio of these two numbers, which is also very close to 1.000272. The wavelengths of all deuterium spectroscopic lines are shorter than the corresponding lines of light hydrogen, by 0.0272%. In astronomical observation, this corresponds to a blue Doppler shift of 0.0272% of the speed of light, or 81.6 km/s.

The differences are much more pronounced in vibrational spectroscopy such as infrared spectroscopy and Raman spectroscopy, and in rotational spectra such as microwave spectroscopy because the reduced mass of the deuterium is markedly higher than that of protium. In nuclear magnetic resonance spectroscopy, deuterium has a very different NMR frequency (e.g. 61 MHz when protium is at 400 MHz) and is much less sensitive. Deuterated solvents are usually used in protium NMR to prevent the solvent from overlapping with the signal, though deuterium NMR in its own right is also possible.

=== Big Bang nucleosynthesis ===
Synthesis during the formation of the universe is the only significant way naturally occurring deuterium has been created; it is destroyed in stellar fusion. Deuterium is thought to have played an important role in setting the number and ratios of the elements that were formed in the Big Bang. Combining thermodynamics and the changes brought about by cosmic expansion, one can calculate the fraction of protons and neutrons based on the temperature at the point that the universe cooled enough to allow formation of nuclei. This calculation indicates seven protons for every neutron at the beginning of nucleogenesis, a ratio that would remain stable even after nucleogenesis was over. This fraction was in favor of protons initially, primarily because the lower mass of the proton favored their production. As the Universe expanded, it cooled. Free neutrons and protons are less stable than helium nuclei, and the protons and neutrons had a strong energetic reason to form helium-4. However, forming helium-4 requires the intermediate step of forming deuterium.

Through much of the few minutes after the Big Bang during which nucleosynthesis could have occurred, the temperature was high enough that the mean energy per particle was greater than the binding energy of weakly bound deuterium; therefore, any deuterium that was formed was immediately destroyed. This situation is known as the deuterium bottleneck. The bottleneck delayed formation of any helium-4 until the Universe became cool enough to form deuterium (at about a temperature equivalent to 100 keV). At this point, there was a sudden burst of element formation (first deuterium, which immediately fused into helium). However, very soon thereafter, at twenty minutes after the Big Bang, the Universe became too cool for any further nuclear fusion or nucleosynthesis. At this point, the elemental abundances were nearly fixed, changing only as some of the radioactive products of Big Bang nucleosynthesis (such as tritium) decayed. The deuterium bottleneck in the formation of helium, together with the lack of stable ways for helium to combine with hydrogen or with itself (no stable nucleus has a mass number of 5 or 8) meant that an insignificant amount of carbon, or any elements heavier than carbon, formed in the Big Bang. These elements thus required formation in stars. At the same time, the failure of much nucleogenesis during the Big Bang ensured that there would be plenty of hydrogen in the later universe available to form long-lived stars, such as the Sun.

=== Abundance ===
Simplified chart of particle content

Deuterium occurs in trace amounts naturally as deuterium gas (^{2}H_{2} or D_{2}), but most deuterium in the Universe is bonded with ^{1}H to form a gas called hydrogen deuteride (HD or ^{1}H^{2}H). Similarly, natural water contains deuterated molecules, almost all as semiheavy water HDO with only one deuterium.

The existence of deuterium on Earth, elsewhere in the Solar System (as confirmed by planetary probes), and in the spectra of stars, is also an important datum in cosmology. Gamma radiation from ordinary nuclear fusion dissociates deuterium into protons and neutrons, and there is no known natural process other than Big Bang nucleosynthesis that might have produced deuterium at anything close to its observed natural abundance. Deuterium is produced by the rare cluster decay, and occasional absorption of naturally occurring neutrons by light hydrogen, but these are trivial sources. There is thought to be little deuterium in the interior of the Sun and other stars, as at these temperatures the nuclear fusion reactions that consume deuterium happen much faster than the proton–proton reaction that creates deuterium. However, deuterium persists in the outer solar atmosphere at roughly the same concentration as in Jupiter, and this has probably been unchanged since the origin of the Solar System. The natural abundance of ^{2}H seems to be a very similar fraction of hydrogen, wherever hydrogen is found, unless there are obvious processes at work that concentrate it.

The existence of deuterium at a low but constant primordial fraction in all hydrogen is another one of the arguments in favor of the Big Bang over the Steady State theory of the Universe. The observed ratios of hydrogen to helium to deuterium in the universe are difficult to explain except with a Big Bang model. It is estimated that the abundances of deuterium have not evolved significantly since their production about 13.8 billion years ago. Measurements of Milky Way galactic deuterium from ultraviolet spectral analysis show a ratio of as much as 23 atoms of deuterium per million hydrogen atoms in undisturbed gas clouds, which is only 15% below the WMAP estimated primordial ratio of about 27 atoms per million from the Big Bang. This has been interpreted to mean that less deuterium has been destroyed in star formation in the Milky Way galaxy than expected, or perhaps deuterium has been replenished by a large in-fall of primordial hydrogen from outside the galaxy. In space a few hundred light years from the Sun, deuterium abundance is only 15 atoms per million, but this value is presumably influenced by differential adsorption of deuterium onto carbon dust grains in interstellar space.

The abundance of deuterium in Jupiter's atmosphere has been directly measured by the Galileo space probe as 26 atoms per million hydrogen atoms. ISO-SWS observations find 22 atoms per million hydrogen atoms in Jupiter, and this abundance is thought to represent close to the primordial Solar System ratio. This is about 17% of the terrestrial ratio of 156 deuterium atoms per million hydrogen atoms.

Comets such as Comet Hale–Bopp and Halley's Comet have been measured to contain more deuterium (about 200 atoms per million hydrogens), ratios which are enriched with respect to the presumed protosolar nebula ratio, probably due to heating, and which are similar to the ratios found in Earth seawater. The recent measurement of deuterium amounts of 161 atoms per million hydrogen in Comet 103P/Hartley (a former Kuiper belt object), a ratio almost exactly that in Earth's oceans (155.76 ± 0.1, but in fact from 153 to 156 ppm), emphasizes the theory that Earth's surface water may be largely from comets. Most recently the ^{2}H^{1}HR of 67P/Churyumov–Gerasimenko as measured by Rosetta is about three times that of Earth water. This has caused renewed interest in suggestions that Earth's water may be partly of asteroidal origin.

Deuterium has also been observed to be concentrated over the mean solar abundance in other terrestrial planets, in particular Mars and Venus.

=== Production ===
Deuterium is produced for industrial, scientific and military purposes, by starting with ordinary water—a small fraction of which is naturally occurring heavy water—and then separating out the heavy water by the Girdler sulfide process, distillation, or other methods.

In theory, deuterium for heavy water could be created in a nuclear reactor, but separation from ordinary water is the cheapest bulk production process.

The world's leading supplier of deuterium was Atomic Energy of Canada Limited until 1997, when the last heavy water plant was shut down. Canada uses heavy water as a neutron moderator for the operation of the CANDU reactor design.

Another major producer of heavy water is India. All but one of India's atomic energy plants are pressurized heavy water plants, which use natural (i.e., not enriched) uranium. India has eight heavy water plants, of which seven are in operation. Six plants, of which five are in operation, are based on D–H exchange in ammonia gas. The other two plants extract deuterium from natural water in a process that uses hydrogen sulfide gas at high pressure.

While India is self-sufficient in heavy water for its own use, India also exports reactor-grade heavy water.

== Properties ==
=== Data for molecular deuterium ===
Formula: D_{2} or ^{2}_{1}H_{2}

- Density: 0.180 kg/m^{3} at STP (0 °C, 101325 Pa).
- Atomic weight: 2.0141017926 Da.
- Mean abundance in ocean water (from VSMOW) 155.76 ± 0.1 atoms of deuterium per million atoms of all isotopes of hydrogen (about 1 atom of in 6420); that is, about 0.015% of all atoms of hydrogen (any isotope)

Data at about 18 K for ^{2}H_{2} (triple point):

- Density:
  - Liquid: 162.4 kg/m^{3}
  - Gas: 0.452 kg/m^{3}
  - Liquefied ^{2}H_{2}O: 1105.2 kg/m^{3} at STP
- Viscosity: 12.6 μPa·s at 300 K (gas phase)
- Specific heat capacity at constant pressure c_{p}:
  - Solid: 2950 J/(kg·K)
  - Gas: 5200 J/(kg·K)

=== Physical properties ===
Compared to hydrogen in its natural composition on Earth, pure deuterium (^{2}H_{2}) has a higher melting point (18.72 K vs. 13.99 K), a higher boiling point (23.64 vs. 20.27 K), a higher critical temperature (38.3 vs. 32.94 K) and a higher critical pressure (1.6496 vs. 1.2858 MPa).

The physical properties of deuterium compounds can exhibit significant kinetic isotope effects and other physical and chemical property differences from the protium analogs. ^{2}H_{2}O, for example, is more viscous than normal H_{2}O. There are differences in bond energy and length for compounds of heavy hydrogen isotopes compared to protium, which are larger than the isotopic differences in any other element. Bonds involving deuterium and tritium are somewhat stronger than the corresponding bonds in protium, and these differences are enough to cause significant changes in biological reactions. Pharmaceutical firms are interested in the fact that ^{2}H is harder to remove from carbon than ^{1}H.

Deuterium can replace ^{1}H in water molecules to form heavy water (^{2}H_{2}O), which is about 10.6% denser than normal water (so that ice made from it sinks in normal water). Heavy water is slightly toxic in eukaryotic animals, with 25% substitution of the body water causing cell division problems and sterility, and 50% substitution causing death by cytotoxic syndrome (bone marrow failure and gastrointestinal lining failure). Prokaryotic organisms, however, can survive and grow in pure heavy water, though they develop slowly. Despite this toxicity, consumption of heavy water under normal circumstances does not pose a health threat to humans. It is estimated that a 70 kg (154 lb) person might drink 4.8 litres (1.3 US gal) of heavy water without serious consequences. Small doses of heavy water (a few grams in humans, containing an amount of deuterium comparable to that normally present in the body) are routinely used as harmless metabolic tracers in humans and animals.

=== Quantum properties ===
The deuteron has spin +1 ("triplet state") and is thus a boson. The NMR frequency of deuterium is significantly different from normal hydrogen. Infrared spectroscopy also easily differentiates many deuterated compounds, due to the large difference in IR absorption frequency seen in the vibration of a chemical bond containing deuterium, versus light hydrogen. The two stable isotopes of hydrogen can also be distinguished by using mass spectrometry.

The triplet deuteron nucleon is barely bound at E_{B} = 2.23 MeV, and none of the higher energy states are bound. The singlet deuteron is a virtual state, with a negative binding energy of ~60 keV. There is no such stable particle, but this virtual particle transiently exists during neutron–proton inelastic scattering, accounting for the unusually large neutron scattering cross-section of the proton.

=== Nuclear properties (deuteron) ===
==== Deuteron mass and radius ====
The deuterium nucleus is called a deuteron. It has a mass of 2.013553212544(15) Da (1875.61294500(58) MeV/c^{2}).

The charge radius of a deuteron is 2.12778(27)×10^{−15} m.

Like the proton radius, measurements using muonic deuterium produce a smaller result: 2.12562(78) fm.

==== Spin and energy ====
Deuterium is one of only five stable nuclides with an odd number of protons and an odd number of neutrons. (^{2}H, ^{6}Li, ^{10}B, ^{14}N, ^{180m}Ta; the long-lived radionuclides ^{40}K, ^{50}V, ^{138}La, ^{176}Lu also occur naturally.) Most odd–odd nuclei are unstable to beta decay, because the decay products are even–even, and thus more strongly bound, due to nuclear pairing effects. Deuterium, however, benefits from having its proton and neutron coupled to a spin-1 state, which gives a stronger nuclear attraction; the corresponding spin-1 state does not exist in the two-neutron or two-proton system, due to the Pauli exclusion principle which would require one or the other identical particle with the same spin to have some other different quantum number, such as orbital angular momentum. But orbital angular momentum of either particle gives a lower binding energy for the system, mainly due to increasing distance of the particles in the steep gradient of the nuclear force. In both cases, this causes the diproton and dineutron to be unstable.

The proton and neutron in deuterium can be dissociated through neutral current interactions with neutrinos. The cross section for this interaction is comparatively large, and deuterium was successfully used as a neutrino target in the Sudbury Neutrino Observatory experiment.

Diatomic deuterium (^{2}H_{2}) has ortho and para nuclear spin isomers like diatomic hydrogen, but with differences in the number and population of spin states and rotational levels, which occur because the deuteron is a boson with nuclear spin equal to one.

==== Isospin singlet state of the deuteron ====
Due to the similarity in mass and nuclear properties between the proton and neutron, they are sometimes considered as two symmetric types of the same object, a nucleon. While only the proton has electric charge, this is often negligible due to the weakness of the electromagnetic interaction relative to the strong nuclear interaction. The symmetry relating the proton and neutron is known as isospin and denoted I (or sometimes T).

Isospin is an SU(2) symmetry, like ordinary spin, so is completely analogous to it. The proton and neutron, each of which have isospin-1/2, form an isospin doublet (analogous to a spin doublet), with a "down" state (↓) being a neutron and an "up" state (↑) being a proton. A pair of nucleons can either be in an antisymmetric state of isospin called singlet, or in a symmetric state called triplet. In terms of the "down" state and "up" state, the singlet is $\textstyle \frac{1}{\sqrt{2} }\left( \vert {\uparrow\downarrow} \rangle - \vert {\downarrow\uparrow} \rangle \right)$, which can also be written $\textstyle \frac{1}{\sqrt{2} }\left( \vert\mathrm{p n} \rangle - \vert\mathrm{n p} \rangle\right)$.

This is a nucleus with one proton and one neutron, i.e. a deuterium nucleus. The triplet is

$$\left(
\begin{array}{ll}
|{\uparrow\uparrow}\rangle\\
\frac{1}{\sqrt{2}}( |{\uparrow\downarrow}\rangle + |{\downarrow\uparrow}\rangle )\\
|{\downarrow\downarrow}\rangle
\end{array}
\right)$$

and thus consists of three types of nuclei, which are supposed to be symmetric: a deuterium nucleus (actually a highly excited state of it), a nucleus with two protons, and a nucleus with two neutrons. These states are not stable.

==== Approximated wavefunction of the deuteron ====
The deuteron wavefunction must be antisymmetric if the isospin representation is used (since a proton and a neutron are not identical particles, the wavefunction need not be antisymmetric in general). Apart from their isospin, the two nucleons also have spin and spatial distributions of their wavefunction. The latter is symmetric if the deuteron is symmetric under parity (i.e. has an "even" or "positive" parity), and antisymmetric if the deuteron is antisymmetric under parity (i.e. has an "odd" or "negative" parity). The parity is fully determined by the total orbital angular momentum of the two nucleons: if it is even then the parity is even (positive), and if it is odd then the parity is odd (negative).

The deuteron, being an isospin singlet, is antisymmetric under nucleons exchange due to isospin, and therefore must be symmetric under the double exchange of their spin and location. Therefore, it can be in either of the following two different states:

- Symmetric spin and symmetric under parity. In this case, the exchange of the two nucleons will multiply the deuterium wavefunction by (−1) from isospin exchange, (+1) from spin exchange and (+1) from parity (location exchange), for a total of (−1) as needed for antisymmetry.
- Antisymmetric spin and antisymmetric under parity. In this case, the exchange of the two nucleons will multiply the deuterium wavefunction by (−1) from isospin exchange, (−1) from spin exchange and (−1) from parity (location exchange), again for a total of (−1) as needed for antisymmetry.

In the first case the deuteron is a spin triplet, so that its total spin s is 1. It also has an even parity and therefore even orbital angular momentum l. The lower its orbital angular momentum, the lower its energy. Therefore, the lowest possible energy state has s = 1, l = 0.

In the second case the deuteron is a spin singlet, so that its total spin s is 0. It also has an odd parity and therefore odd orbital angular momentum l. Therefore, the lowest possible energy state has s = 0, l = 1.

Since s = 1 gives a stronger nuclear attraction, the deuterium ground state is in the s = 1, l = 0 state.

The same considerations lead to the possible states of an isospin triplet having s = 0, l = even or s = 1, l = odd. Thus, the state of lowest energy has s = 1, l = 1, higher than that of the isospin singlet.

The analysis just given is in fact only approximate, both because isospin is not an exact symmetry, and more importantly because the strong nuclear interaction between the two nucleons is related to angular momentum in spin–orbit interaction that mixes different s and l states. That is, s and l are not constant in time (they do not commute with the Hamiltonian), and over time a state such as s = 1, l = 0 may become a state of s = 1, l = 2. Parity is still constant in time, so these do not mix with odd l states (such as s = 0, l = 1). Therefore, the quantum state of the deuterium is a superposition (a linear combination) of the s = 1, l = 0 state and the s = 1, l = 2 state, even though the first component is much bigger. Since the total angular momentum j is also a good quantum number (it is a constant in time), both components must have the same j, and therefore j = 1. This is the total spin of the deuterium nucleus.

To summarize, the deuterium nucleus is antisymmetric in terms of isospin, and has spin 1 and even (+1) parity. The relative angular momentum of its nucleons l is not well defined, and the deuteron is a superposition of mostly l = 0 with some l = 2.

==== Magnetic and electric multipoles ====
In order to find theoretically the deuterium magnetic dipole moment μ, one uses the formula for a nuclear magnetic moment

$$\mu =
\frac{1}{j+1}\bigl\langle(l,s),j,m_j{=}j \,\bigr|\, \vec{\mu}\cdot \vec{\jmath} \,\bigl|\,(l,s),j,m_j{=}j\bigr\rangle$$

with

$$\vec{\mu} = g^{(l)}\vec{l} + g^{(s)}\vec{s}$$

g^{(l)} and g^{(s)} are g-factors of the nucleons.

Since the proton and neutron have different values for g^{(l)} and g^{(s)}, one must separate their contributions. Each gets half of the deuterium orbital angular momentum $\vec{l}$ and spin $\vec{s}$. One arrives at

$$\mu =
\frac{1}{j+1} \Bigl\langle(l,s),j,m_j{=}j \,\Bigr|\left(\frac{1}{2}\vec{l} {g^{(l)}}_p + \frac{1}{2}\vec{s} ({g^{(s)}}_p + {g^{(s)}}_n)\right)\cdot \vec{\jmath} \,\Bigl|\, (l,s),j,m_j{=}j \Bigr\rangle$$

where subscripts p and n stand for the proton and neutron, and g^{(l)}_{n} = 0.

By using the same identities as here and using the value g^{(l)}_{p} = 1, one gets the following result, in units of the nuclear magneton μ_{N}

$$\mu =
\frac{1}{4(j+1)}\left[({g^{(s)}}_p + {g^{(s)}}_n)\big(j(j+1) - l(l+1) + s(s+1)\big) + \big(j(j+1) + l(l+1) - s(s+1)\big)\right]$$

For the s = 1, l = 0 state (j = 1), we obtain

$$\mu = \frac{1}{2}({g^{(s)}}_p + {g^{(s)}}_n) = 0.879$$

For the s = 1, l = 2 state (j = 1), we obtain

$$\mu = -\frac{1}{4}({g^{(s)}}_p + {g^{(s)}}_n) + \frac{3}{4} = 0.310$$

The measured value of the deuterium magnetic dipole moment, is 0.857 μ_{N}, which is 97.5% of the 0.879 μ_{N} value obtained by simply adding moments of the proton and neutron. This suggests that the state of the deuterium is indeed to a good approximation s = 1, l = 0 state, which occurs with both nucleons spinning in the same direction, but their magnetic moments subtracting because of the neutron's negative moment.

But the slightly lower experimental number than that which results from simple addition of proton and (negative) neutron moments shows that deuterium is actually a linear combination of mostly s = 1, l = 0 state with a slight admixture of s = 1, l = 2 state.

The electric dipole is zero as usual.

The measured electric quadrupole of the deuterium is 0.2859 e·fm^{2}. While the order of magnitude is reasonable, since the deuteron radius is of order of 1 femtometer (see below) and its electric charge is e, the above model does not suffice for its computation. More specifically, the electric quadrupole does not get a contribution from the l = 0 state (which is the dominant one) and does get a contribution from a term mixing the l = 0 and the l = 2 states, because the electric quadrupole operator does not commute with angular momentum.

The latter contribution is dominant in the absence of a pure l = 0 contribution, but cannot be calculated without knowing the exact spatial form of the nucleons wavefunction inside the deuterium.

Higher magnetic and electric multipole moments cannot be calculated by the above model, for similar reasons.

== Applications ==
=== Nuclear reactors ===
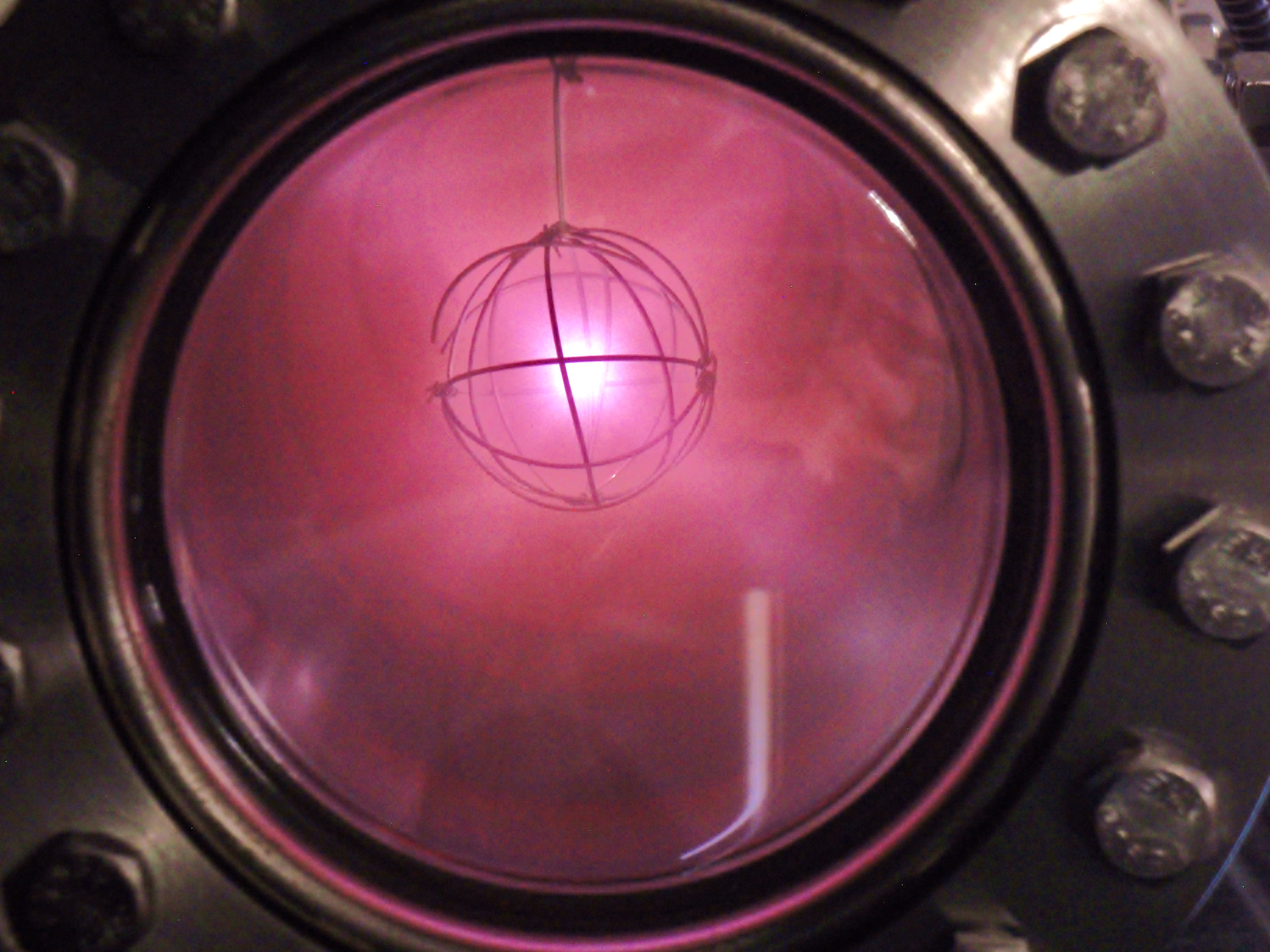
Ionized deuterium in a fusor reactor giving off its characteristic pinkish-red glow

Deuterium is used in heavy water moderated fission reactors, usually as liquid ^{2}H_{2}O, to slow neutrons without the high neutron absorption of ordinary hydrogen. This is a common commercial use for larger amounts of deuterium.

In research reactors, liquid ^{2}H_{2} is used in cold sources to moderate neutrons to very low energies and wavelengths appropriate for scattering experiments.

Experimentally, deuterium is the most common nuclide used in fusion reactor designs, especially in combination with tritium, because of the large nuclear cross section which makes fusion more probable and its high energy yield of the deuterium–tritium (DT) reaction. There is an even higher-yield ^{2}H–^{3}He fusion reaction, though the breakeven point of ^{2}H–^{3}He is higher than that of most other fusion reactions; together with the scarcity of ^{3}He, this makes it implausible as a practical power source, at least until DT and deuterium–deuterium (DD) fusion have been performed on a commercial scale. Commercial nuclear fusion is not yet an accomplished technology.

=== NMR spectroscopy ===
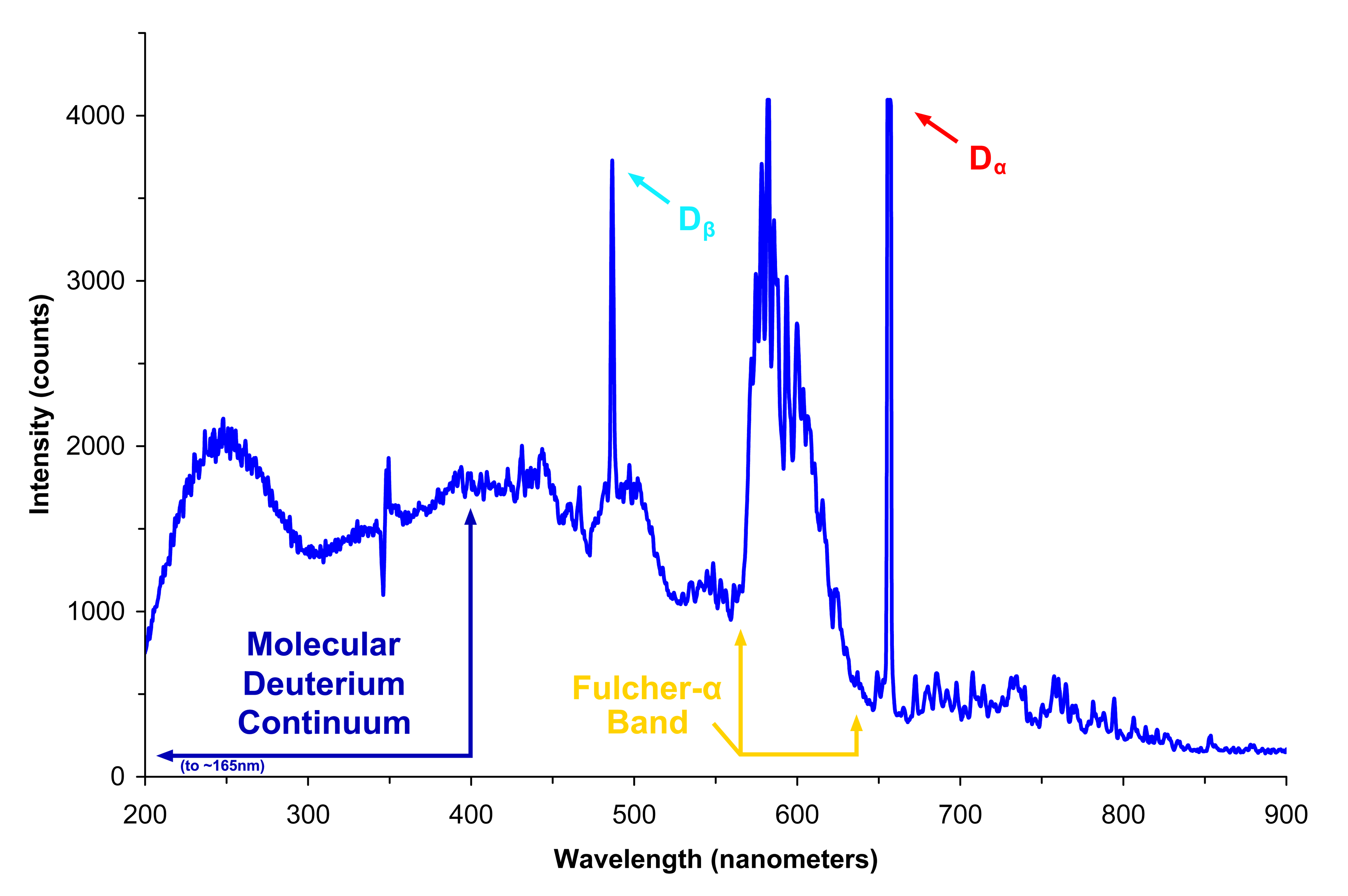
Emission spectrum of an ultraviolet deuterium arc lamp

Deuterium is most commonly used in hydrogen nuclear magnetic resonance spectroscopy (proton NMR) in the following way. NMR ordinarily requires compounds of interest to be analyzed as dissolved in solution. Because of deuterium's nuclear spin properties which differ from the light hydrogen usually present in organic molecules, NMR spectra of hydrogen/protium are highly differentiable from that of deuterium, and in practice deuterium is not "seen" by an NMR instrument tuned for ^{1}H. Deuterated solvents (including heavy water, but also compounds like deuterated chloroform, CDCl_{3} or C^{2}HCl_{3}, are therefore routinely used in NMR spectroscopy, in order to allow only the light-hydrogen spectra of the compound of interest to be measured, without solvent-signal interference.

Nuclear magnetic resonance spectroscopy can also be used to obtain information about the deuteron's environment in isotopically labelled samples (deuterium NMR). For example, the configuration of hydrocarbon chains in lipid bilayers can be quantified using solid state deuterium NMR with deuterium-labelled lipid molecules.

Deuterium NMR spectra are especially informative in the solid state because of its relatively small quadrupole moment in comparison with those of bigger quadrupolar nuclei such as chlorine-35, for example.

=== Mass spectrometry ===
Deuterated (i.e. where all or some hydrogen atoms are replaced with deuterium) compounds are often used as internal standards in mass spectrometry. Like other isotopically labeled species, such standards improve accuracy, while often at a much lower cost than other isotopically labeled standards. Deuterated molecules are usually prepared via hydrogen isotope exchange reactions.

=== Tracing ===
In chemistry, biochemistry and environmental sciences, deuterium is used as a non-radioactive, stable isotopic tracer, for example, in the doubly labeled water test. In chemical reactions and metabolic pathways, deuterium behaves somewhat similarly to ordinary hydrogen (with a few chemical differences, as noted). It can be distinguished from normal hydrogen most easily by its mass, using mass spectrometry or infrared spectrometry. Deuterium can be detected by femtosecond infrared spectroscopy, since the mass difference drastically affects the frequency of molecular vibrations; ^{2}H–carbon bond vibrations are found in spectral regions free of other signals.

Measurements of small variations in the natural abundances of deuterium, along with those of the stable heavy oxygen isotopes ^{17}O and ^{18}O, are of importance in hydrology, to trace the geographic origin of Earth's waters. The heavy isotopes of hydrogen and oxygen in rainwater (meteoric water) are enriched as a function of the temperature of the region where the precipitation falls (and thus enrichment is related to latitude). The relative enrichment of the heavy isotopes in rainwater (as referenced to mean ocean water), when plotted against temperature falls predictably along a line called the global meteoric water line (GMWL). This plot allows samples of precipitation-originated water to be identified along with general information about the climate in which it originated. Evaporative and other processes in bodies of water, and also ground water processes, also differentially alter the ratios of heavy hydrogen and oxygen isotopes in fresh and salt waters, in characteristic and often regionally distinctive ways. The ratio of concentration of ^{2}H to ^{1}H is usually indicated with a delta as δ^{2}H and the geographic patterns of these values are plotted in maps termed as isoscapes. Stable isotopes are incorporated into plants and animals and an analysis of the ratios in a migrant bird or insect can help suggest a rough guide to their origins.

=== Contrast properties ===
Neutron scattering techniques particularly profit from availability of deuterated samples: The ^{1}H and ^{2}H cross sections are very distinct and different in sign, which allows contrast variation in such experiments. Further, a nuisance problem of normal hydrogen is its large incoherent neutron cross section, which is nil for ^{2}H. The substitution of deuterium for normal hydrogen thus reduces scattering noise.

Hydrogen is an important and major component in all materials of organic chemistry and life science, but it barely interacts with X-rays. As hydrogen atoms (including deuterium) interact strongly with neutrons; neutron scattering techniques, together with a modern deuteration facility, fills a niche in many studies of macromolecules in biology and many other areas.

=== Nuclear weapons ===
See below. Most stars, including the Sun, generate energy over most of their lives by fusing hydrogen into heavier elements; yet such fusion of light hydrogen (protium) has never been successful in the conditions attainable on Earth. Thus, all artificial fusion, including the hydrogen fusion in hydrogen bombs, requires heavy hydrogen (deuterium, tritium, or both).

=== Drugs ===
A deuterated drug is a small molecule medicinal product in which one or more of the hydrogen atoms in the drug molecule have been replaced by deuterium. Because of the kinetic isotope effect, deuterium-containing drugs may have significantly lower rates of metabolism, and hence a longer half-life. In 2017, deutetrabenazine became the first deuterated drug to receive FDA approval.

=== Reinforced essential nutrients ===
Deuterium can be used to reinforce specific oxidation-vulnerable C–H bonds within essential or conditionally essential nutrients, such as certain amino acids, or polyunsaturated fatty acids (PUFA), making them more resistant to oxidative damage. Deuterated polyunsaturated fatty acids, such as linoleic acid, slow down the chain reaction of lipid peroxidation that damage living cells. Deuterated ethyl ester of linoleic acid (RT001), developed by Retrotope, is in a compassionate use trial in infantile neuroaxonal dystrophy and has successfully completed a Phase I/II trial in Friedreich's ataxia.

=== Thermostabilization ===
Live vaccines, such as oral polio vaccine, can be stabilized by deuterium, either alone or in combination with other stabilizers such as MgCl_{2}.

=== Slowing circadian oscillations ===
Deuterium has been shown to lengthen the period of oscillation of the circadian clock when dosed in rats, hamsters, and Gonyaulax dinoflagellates. In rats, chronic intake of 25% ^{2}H_{2}O disrupts circadian rhythm by lengthening the circadian period of suprachiasmatic nucleus-dependent rhythms in the brain's hypothalamus. Experiments in hamsters also support the theory that deuterium acts directly on the suprachiasmatic nucleus to lengthen the free-running circadian period.

== History ==
=== Before the search ===
The earliest mention of some matter with the properties of deuterium was a passing mention in Ernest Rutherford's 1919 Bakerian lecture. In this theory, the deuterium nucleus with mass two and charge one would contain two protons and one nuclear electron. Also in 1919, Otto Stern and Max Volmer reported on diffusion experiments with water which they claimed disproved the existence of isotopes of hydrogen; their conclusions were assumed to be correct throughout the 1920s.

=== Deuterium detected ===
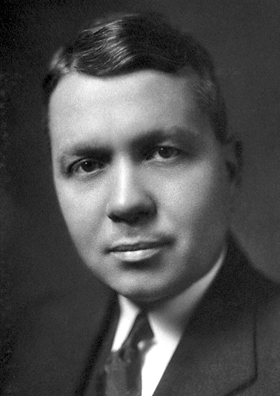
Harold Urey, deuterium's discoverer

It was first detected spectroscopically in late 1931 by Harold Urey, a chemist at Columbia University. Urey's collaborator, Ferdinand Brickwedde, distilled five liters of cryogenically produced liquid hydrogen to 1 mL of liquid, using the low-temperature physics laboratory that had recently been established at the National Bureau of Standards (now National Institute of Standards and Technology) in Washington, DC. The technique had previously been used to isolate heavy isotopes of neon. The cryogenic boiloff technique concentrated the fraction of the mass-2 isotope of hydrogen to a degree that made its spectroscopic identification unambiguous.

=== Naming of the isotope and Nobel Prize ===
Urey created the names protium, deuterium, and tritium in an article published in 1934. The name is based in part on advice from Gilbert N. Lewis who had proposed the name "deutium". The name comes from Greek deuteros 'second', and the nucleus was to be called a "deuteron" or "deuton". Isotopes and new elements were traditionally given the name that their discoverer decided. Some British scientists, such as Ernest Rutherford, wanted to call the isotope "diplogen", from Greek diploos 'double', and the nucleus to be called "diplon".

The amount inferred for normal abundance of deuterium was so small (only about 1 atom in 6400 hydrogen atoms in seawater [156 parts per million]) that it had not noticeably affected previous measurements of (average) hydrogen atomic mass. This explained why it had not been suspected before. Urey was able to concentrate water to show partial enrichment of deuterium. Lewis, Urey's graduate advisor at Berkeley, had prepared and characterized the first samples of pure heavy water in 1933. The discovery of deuterium, coming before the discovery of the neutron in 1932, was an experimental shock to theory; but when the neutron was reported, making deuterium's existence more explicable, Urey was awarded the Nobel Prize in Chemistry only three years after the isotope's isolation. Lewis was deeply disappointed by the Nobel Committee's decision in 1934 and several high-ranking administrators at Berkeley believed this disappointment played a central role in his suicide a decade later.

=== "Heavy water" experiments in World War II ===
Shortly before the war, Hans von Halban and Lew Kowarski moved their research on neutron moderation from France to Britain, smuggling the entire global supply of heavy water (which had been made in Norway) across in twenty-six steel drums.

During World War II, Nazi Germany was known to be conducting experiments using heavy water as moderator for a nuclear reactor design. Such experiments were a source of concern because they might allow them to produce plutonium for an atomic bomb. Ultimately it led to the Allied operation called the "Norwegian heavy water sabotage", the purpose of which was to destroy the Vemork deuterium production/enrichment facility in Norway. At the time this was considered important to the potential progress of the war.

After World War II ended, the Allies discovered that Germany was not putting as much serious effort into the program as had been previously thought. The Germans had completed only a small, partly built experimental reactor (which had been hidden away) and had been unable to sustain a chain reaction. By the end of the war, the Germans did not even have a fifth of the amount of heavy water needed to run the reactor, partially due to the Norwegian heavy water sabotage operation. However, even if the Germans had succeeded in getting a reactor operational (as the U.S. did with Chicago Pile-1 in late 1942), they would still have been at least several years away from the development of an atomic bomb. The engineering process, even with maximal effort and funding, required about two and a half years (from first critical reactor to bomb) in both the U.S. and U.S.S.R., for example.

=== In thermonuclear weapons ===
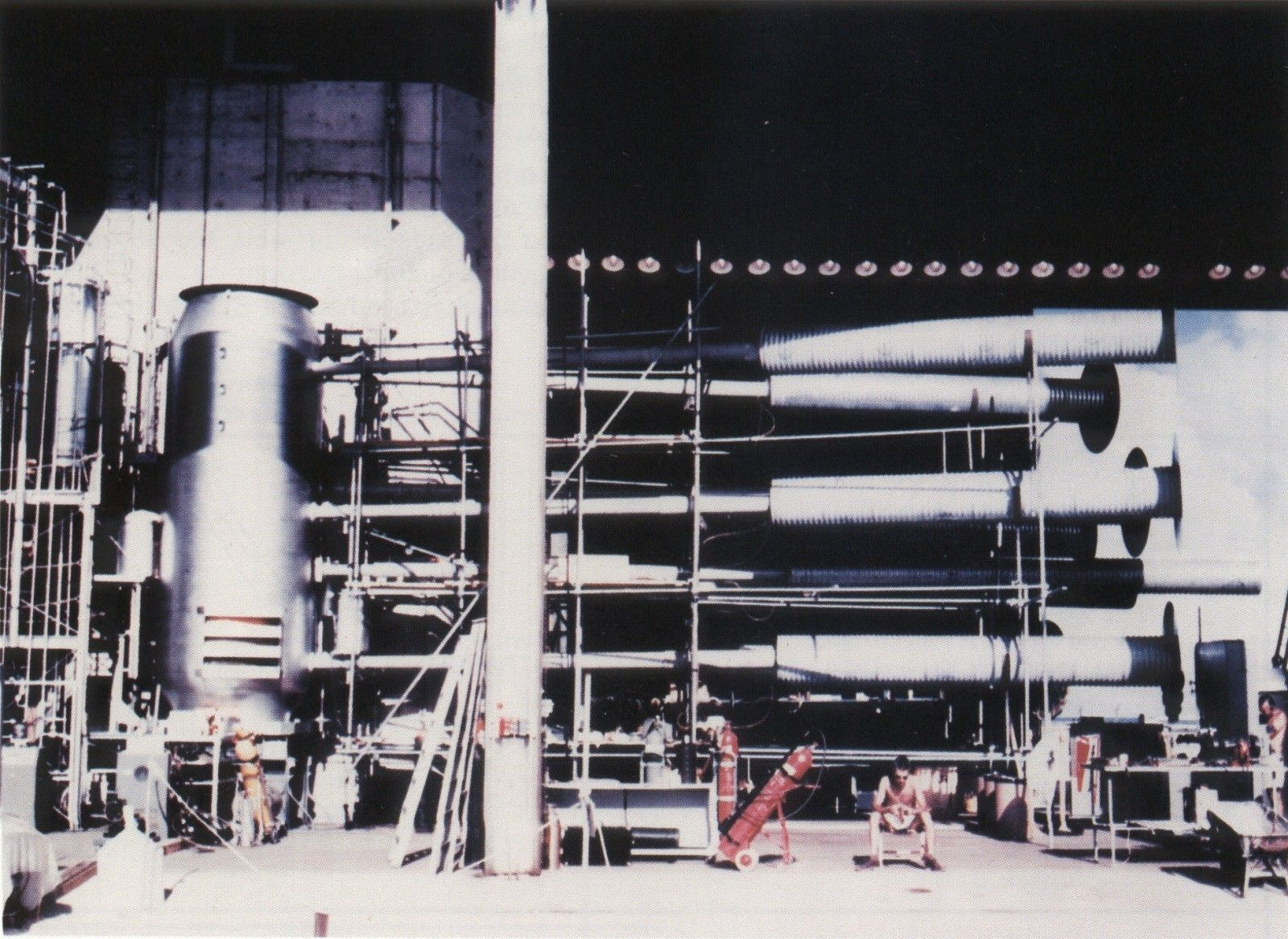
The "Sausage" device casing of the Ivy Mike H bomb, attached to instrumentation and cryogenic equipment. The 20-ft-tall bomb held a cryogenic Dewar flask with room for 160 kg of liquid deuterium.

The 62-ton Ivy Mike device built by the United States and exploded on 1 November 1952, was the first fully successful hydrogen bomb (thermonuclear bomb). In this context, it was the first bomb in which most of the energy released came from nuclear reaction stages that followed the primary nuclear fission stage of the atomic bomb. The Ivy Mike bomb was a factory-like building, rather than a deliverable weapon. At its center, a very large cylindrical, insulated vacuum flask or cryostat, held cryogenic liquid deuterium in a volume of about 1000 liters (160 kilograms in mass, if this volume had been completely filled). Then, a conventional atomic bomb (the "primary") at one end of the bomb was used to create the conditions of extreme temperature and pressure that were needed to set off the thermonuclear reaction.

Within a few years, so-called "dry" hydrogen bombs were developed that did not need cryogenic hydrogen. Released information suggests that all thermonuclear weapons built since then contain chemical compounds of deuterium and lithium in their secondary stages. The material that contains the deuterium is mostly lithium deuteride, with the lithium consisting of the isotope lithium-6. When the lithium-6 is bombarded with fast neutrons from the atomic bomb, tritium (hydrogen-3) is produced, and then the deuterium and the tritium quickly engage in thermonuclear fusion, releasing abundant energy, helium-4, and even more free neutrons. "Pure" fusion weapons such as the Tsar Bomba are believed to be obsolete. In most modern ("boosted") thermonuclear weapons, fusion directly provides only a small fraction of the total energy. Fission of a natural uranium-238 tamper by fast neutrons produced from D–T fusion accounts for a much larger (i.e. boosted) energy release than the fusion reaction itself.

=== Modern research ===
In August 2018, scientists announced the transformation of gaseous deuterium into a liquid metallic form. This may help researchers better understand gas giant planets, such as Jupiter, Saturn and some exoplanets, since such planets are thought to contain a lot of liquid metallic hydrogen, which may be responsible for their observed powerful magnetic fields.

== Antideuterium and the antideuteron ==
An antideuteron is the antimatter counterpart of the deuteron, consisting of an antiproton and an antineutron. The antideuteron was first produced in 1965 at the Proton Synchrotron at CERN and the Alternating Gradient Synchrotron at Brookhaven National Laboratory. A complete atom, with a positron orbiting the nucleus, would be called antideuterium, but as of 2019 antideuterium has not yet been created. The symbol used for antideuterium is D̅, that is, D with an overbar.

== See also ==
- Isotopes of hydrogen
- Tokamak

Lighter: hydrogen-1	Deuterium is an isotope of hydrogen	Heavier: Tritium
Decay product of: —	Decay chain of deuterium	Decays to: Stable
