= Chain Reaction (music venue) =

Former all-ages music venue in Anaheim, California

- Address: 1652 W. Lincoln Avenue; Anaheim, California; United States
- Location: 33°49′55″N 117°56′22″W
- Owner: Andy Serrao
- Capacity: 250
- Type: All-ages music venue

Construction
- Opened: 1996
- Closed: December 19, 2025

Website
- allages.com

Chain Reaction was an all-ages music venue in Anaheim, California, United States. Opened in 1996, it became a longtime hub for punk rock, ska, hardcore, emo and related scenes in Orange County, and was known for hosting emerging local acts as well as touring bands early in their careers. The venue closed in December 2025 following a final run of shows.

== History ==
Chain Reaction was founded in 1996 by Tim Hill, who opened the space as an all-ages live-music venue on Lincoln Avenue in Anaheim. The club’s first concert took place over Labor Day weekend in 1996 under the original name Public Storage Coffee Lounge. Hill later described the early period as requiring additional licensing and permits before the venue could operate regularly as a live all-ages venue.

The venue developed a reputation within the regional alternative-music circuit for booking bands that later achieved wider commercial success, and for functioning as a consistent stop for touring acts in Southern California. OC Weekly described Chain Reaction as located in a strip mall near the intersection of Lincoln Avenue and Euclid Boulevard and characterized it as a long-running alcohol-free, all-ages space that catered to teen audiences for much of its history.

=== Ownership and booking ===
Andy Serrao, who had booked shows for the venue since 2006, purchased Chain Reaction from Hill in 2015. In 2019, OC Weekly reported that the venue entered a strategic partnership (described as a joint venture) with Live Nation while remaining under Serrao’s direction.

== Cultural role and notable performances ==
Chain Reaction was frequently cited as an influential small venue within the Orange County alternative-music community, especially for providing an all-ages environment for younger audiences. The Los Angeles Times reported that the venue helped foster Orange County breakout bands including Touché Amoré, Atreyu, Thrice, Throwdown and Eighteen Visions, and also served as an early tour stop for acts including Paramore, Fall Out Boy, Jimmy Eat World, Dashboard Confessional, Yellowcard, My Chemical Romance and The Used. The same report noted that the venue hosted occasional “secret shows” for acts including The Offspring and New Found Glory, and for Billie Joe Armstrong’s side project Pinhead Gunpowder.

== Festivals and related events ==
Chain Reaction was associated with regional festivals and off-site events connected to its booking brand. OC Weekly reported that Serrao produced and promoted festivals including Chain Fest and High and Low Fest. OC Weekly coverage of Chain Fest noted that the festival was tied to the venue’s 20th anniversary and featured bands connected to the venue’s history and audience.

== Closure ==
In December 2025, Chain Reaction announced it would close, with final shows scheduled for December 18–19. Reporting on the closure, the Los Angeles Times cited declining attendance, financial pressures following the COVID-19 pandemic, and an unsuccessful effort to improve profitability by adding a bar to the long-running dry venue. LAist described the venue as a longstanding “cradle” for alternative and indie bands in Orange County and covered the closure announcement as part of a broader shift in the local live-music landscape.
