= Deulinoleate ethyl =

Chemical compound

Clinical data
- Other names: RT001; Di-deuterated ethyl linoleate; Di-deuterated linoleic acid ethyl ester, 11,11-d_{2}-Ethyl linoleate, or Ethyl 11,11-d_{2}-linoleate
- Routes of administration: Oral
- ATC code: none

Legal status
- Legal status: Investigational

Identifiers
- IUPAC name: Ethyl (9Z,12Z)-(11,11-²H₂)octadeca-9,12-dienoate
- CAS Number: 1404475-07-5
- PubChem CID: 124037379
- DrugBank: DB16949
- ChemSpider: 64853828
- UNII: 24B102R86P
- KEGG: D12361
- ChEMBL: ChEMBL5095415
- CompTox Dashboard (EPA): DTXSID201192521

Chemical and physical data
- Formula: C_{20}H_{34}D_{2}O_{2}
- Molar mass: 310.517 g·mol^{−1}
- 3D model (JSmol): Interactive image
- Density: 0.88 g/cm^{3}
- Boiling point: 173–177 °C (343–351 °F)
- SMILES: CCCCCC=CCC=CCCCCCCCC(=O)OCC
- InChI: InChI=1S/C20H36O2/c1-3-5-6-7-8-9-10-11-12-13-14-15-16-17-18-19-20(21)22-4-2/h8-9,11-12H,3-7,10,13-19H2,1-2H3/b9-8-,12-11-/i10D2; Key:FMMOOAYVCKXGMF-XMCVDNGOSA-N

Deulinoleate ethyl (also known as di-deuterated ethyl linoleate, di-deuterated linoleic acid ethyl ester, 11,11-d_{2}-ethyl linoleate, or ethyl 11,11-d_{2}-linoleate) is an experimental, orally-bioavailable synthetic deuterated polyunsaturated fatty acid (PUFA), a part of reinforced lipids. It is an isotopologue of linoleic acid, an essential omega-6 PUFA. The deuterated compound, while identical to natural linoleic acid except for the presence of deuterium, is resistant to lipid peroxidation which makes studies of its cell-protective properties worthwhile.

== Mechanism of action ==
An animated illustration of a chain reaction with slow elements

Deulinoleate ethyl is recognized by cells as identical to normal linoleic acid. But when taken up, it is converted into 13,13-d_{2}-arachidonic acid, a heavy isotope version of arachidonic acid, that gets incorporated into lipid membranes. The deuterated compound resists the non-enzymatic lipid peroxidation (LPO) through isotope effect — a non-antioxidant based mechanism that protects mitochondrial, neuronal and other lipid membranes, thereby greatly reducing the levels of numerous LPO-derived toxic products such as reactive carbonyls.

Deulinoleate ethyl inhibits ferroptosis by stopping the autoxidation process through the kinetic isotope effect. The protective effect of D-PUFAs was verified in erastin- and RSL3-induced ferroptosis models, with demonstrated efficacy in various disease models, particularly neurodegenerative disorders and clinical trials of deulinoleate ethyl begun in 2018.

== Clinical development ==
=== Friedreich's ataxia ===
A double-blind comparator-controlled Phase I/II clinical trial for Friedreich's ataxia, sponsored by Retrotope and Friedreich's Ataxia Research Alliance, was conducted to determine the safety profile and appropriate dosing for consequent trials. Deulinoleate ethyl was promptly absorbed and was found to be safe and tolerable over 28 days at the maximal dose of 9 g/day. It improved peak workload and peak oxygen consumption in the test group compared to the control group who received the equal doses of normal, non-deuterated ethyl linoleate. Another randomized, double-blind, placebo-controlled clinical study began in 2019.

=== Infantile neuroaxonal dystrophy ===
An open-label clinical study for infantile neuroaxonal dystrophy evaluating long-term evaluation of efficacy, safety, tolerability, and pharmacokinetics of deulinoleate ethyl, which, when taken with food, can protect the neuronal cells from degeneration, started in the Summer 2018.

=== Phospholipase 2G6-associated neurodegeneration ===
In 2017, the FDA granted deulinoleate ethyl orphan drug designation in the treatment of phospholipase 2G6-associated neurodegeneration (PLAN).

=== Amyotrophic lateral sclerosis ===
In 2018, deulinoleate ethyl was given to a patient with amyotrophic lateral sclerosis (ALS) under a "compassionate use scheme".

=== Progressive supranuclear palsy ===
In 2020, the FDA granted orphan drug designation deulinoleate ethyl for the treatment of patients with progressive supranuclear palsy (PSP). PSP is a disease involving modification and dysfunction of tau protein; mechanism of action of deulinoleate ethyl both lowers lipid peroxidation and prevents mitochondrial cell death of neurons which is associated with disease onset and progression.

== Preclinical research ==
=== Alzheimer's disease ===
Deulinoleate ethyl has been shown to be effective in a model of Alzheimer's disease in mice.
