= Reply (legal term) =

In law, a reply is a legal document written by a party specifically replying to a responsive declaration and in some cases an answer. A reply may be written when a party or non-moving party (the party who is not requesting relief from the court) is asserting a counterclaim or the court has ordered a reply.

== Document ==
A reply, specifically in California, may be written, filed and served, when a party files a motion or Request for an Order, the non-moving party files a responsive declaration, then the moving-party wants to file a legal document specifically 'replying' to the responsive declaration.

It is important to keep in mind that "plaintiff" in this context may also refer to an impleaded party. So, if a defendant impleads a party, this new party is the third-party defendant and the original defendant is the third-party plaintiff. The third-party plaintiff must file a complaint on the third-party defendant, who then must answer. The court may order a reply to this third-party defendant's answer.

In California, the filing of a reply is subject to CCP 1005 and the reply should be filed and served pursuant to these rules - typically five court days prior to a hearing see California CCP 1005 (b).
