= PLA2G6 =

Protein-coding gene in the species Homo sapiens

Identifiers
- Aliases: PLA2G6, CaI-PLA2, GVI, INAD1, IPLA2-VIA, NBIA2, NBIA2A, NBIA2B, PARK14, PLA2, PNPLA9, iPLA2, iPLA2beta, phospholipase A2 group VI
- External IDs: OMIM: 603604; MGI: 1859152; GeneCards: PLA2G6
Enzyme activity
| EC # | BRENDA | ExPASy | KEGG | MetaCyc |
|---|---|---|---|---|
| 3.1.1.4 | ↗ | ↗ | ↗ | ↗ |
| 3.1.1.5 | ↗ | ↗ | ↗ | ↗ |
| 3.1.2.2 | ↗ | ↗ | ↗ | ↗ |

Gene location (Human)
| Chr. | Chromosome 22 (human) |
| Band | 22q13.1 | Start | 38,111,495 bp |
| Band | 22q13.1 | End | 38,214,778 bp |

Gene location (Mouse)
| Chr. | Chromosome 15 (mouse) |
| Band | 15|15 E1 | Start | 79,286,228 bp |
| Band | 15|15 E1 | End | 79,328,390 bp |
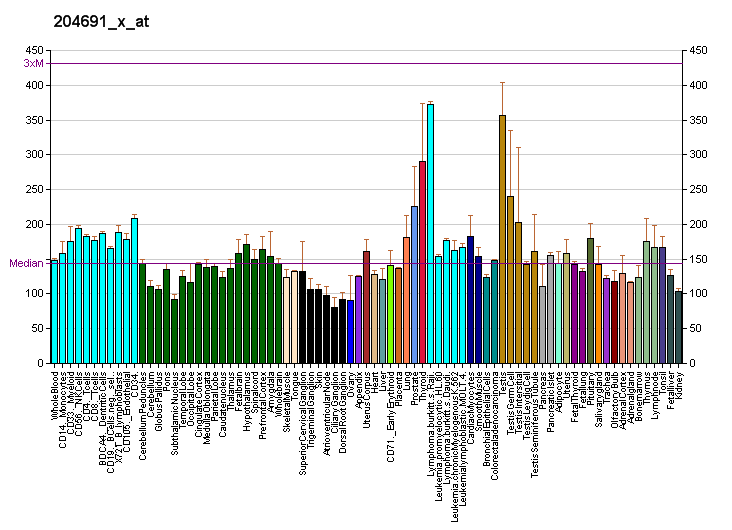

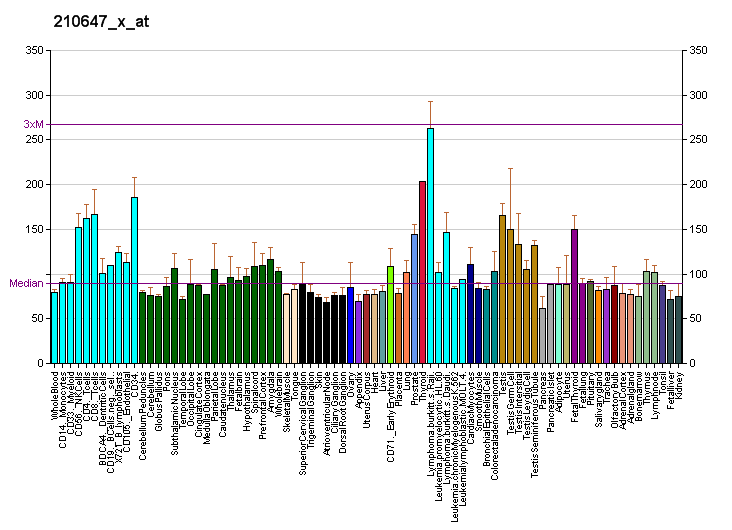

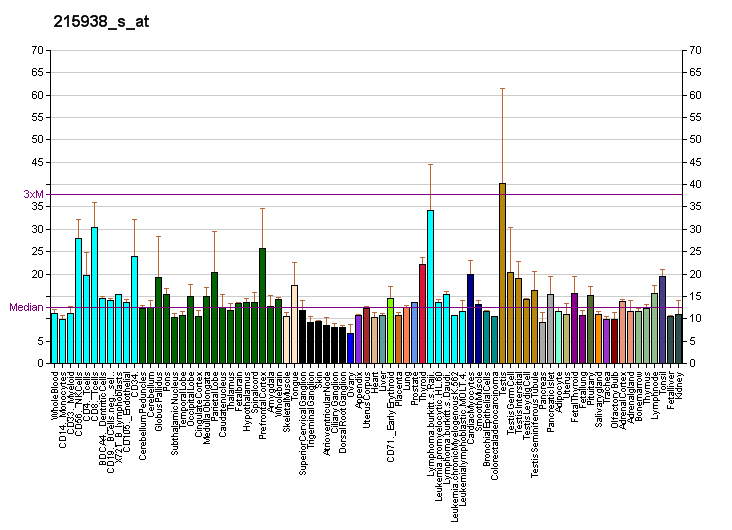
RNA expression pattern
| Bgee | Human / Mouse (ortholog); Top expressed in: right uterine tube; right lobe of thyroid gland; left lobe of thyroid gland; gallbladder; right adrenal cortex; sural nerve; granulocyte; right testis; left ovary; left testis / Top expressed in: gastrula; seminiferous tubule; spermatid; spermatocyte; muscle of thigh; left lobe of liver; transitional epithelium of urinary bladder; islet of Langerhans; yolk sac; brown adipose tissue; More reference expression data |
| BioGPS | More reference expression data |
Gene ontology
| Molecular function | phospholipase A2 activity; ATP-dependent protein binding; calmodulin binding; calcium-independent phospholipase A2 activity; hydrolase activity; serine hydrolase activity; protein kinase binding |
| Cellular component | membrane; microtubule organizing center; mitochondrion; extracellular space; cytoplasm; cytosol |
| Biological process | positive regulation of ceramide biosynthetic process; positive regulation of protein phosphorylation; phosphatidylethanolamine acyl-chain remodeling; urinary bladder smooth muscle contraction; maternal process involved in female pregnancy; Fc-gamma receptor signaling pathway involved in phagocytosis; regulation of store-operated calcium channel activity; positive regulation of protein kinase C signaling; lipid metabolism; positive regulation of cytosolic calcium ion concentration; antibacterial humoral response; memory; response to endoplasmic reticulum stress; chemotaxis; lipid catabolic process; positive regulation of arachidonic acid secretion; cardiolipin biosynthetic process; positive regulation of release of cytochrome c from mitochondria; positive regulation of exocytosis; positive regulation of insulin secretion involved in cellular response to glucose stimulus; metabolism; negative regulation of synaptic transmission, glutamatergic; phosphatidylcholine acyl-chain remodeling |
Sources:Amigo / QuickGO
Orthologs
| Databases | NCBI: entry; OMA: entry |
| Species | Human | Mouse |
| Entrez | 8398 | 53357 |
| Ensembl | ENSG00000184381 | ENSMUSG00000042632 |
| UniProt | O60733 | P97819 |
| RefSeq (mRNA) | NM_001004426; NM_001199562; NM_003560; NM_001349864; NM_001349865 NM_001349866; NM_001349867; NM_001349868; NM_001349869 | NM_001199023; NM_001199024; NM_001199025; NM_016915 |
| RefSeq (protein) | NP_001004426; NP_001186491; NP_003551; NP_001336793; NP_001336794 NP_001336795; NP_001336796; NP_001336797; NP_001336798 | NP_001185952; NP_001185953; NP_001185954; NP_058611 |
| Location (UCSC) | Chr 22: 38.11 – 38.21 Mb | Chr 15: 79.29 – 79.33 Mb |
| PubMed search |
- Wikidata
| View/Edit Human | View/Edit Mouse |

85 kDa calcium-independent phospholipase A2, also known as 85/88 kDa calcium-independent phospholipase A2, Group VI phospholipase A2, Intracellular membrane-associated calcium-independent phospholipase A2 beta, or Patatin-like phospholipase domain-containing protein 9 is an enzyme that in humans is encoded by the PLA2G6 gene.

== Structure ==
The PLA2G6 gene is located on the p arm of chromosome 22 at position 13.1 and it spans 80,605 base pairs. The PLA2G6 gene produces an 18.6 kDa protein composed of 166 amino acids. The resulting protein's structure has been shown to contain a lipase motif and 8 ankyrin repeats. Different from rodent PLA2G6, which is known to share 90% overall amino acid sequence identity with that of the humans, the human PLA2G6 protein contains a 54-residue insertion which codes for a proline-rich region. This insertion has been shown to disrupt the last putative ankyrin repeat, as well as function as a linker region that segregates the N-terminal protein-binding domain from the C-terminal catalytic domain.

== Function ==
The PLA2G6 gene encodes for a phospholipase A2 enzyme, which is a subclass of enzyme that catalyzes the release of fatty acids from phospholipids. This type of enzyme is responsible for breaking down (metabolizing) phospholipids. Phospholipid metabolism is essential for many body processes, including helping to maintain the integrity of the cell membrane.

Specifically, the A2 phospholipase produced from the PLA2G6 gene, sometimes called PLA2 group VI, helps to regulate the levels of a compound called phosphatidylcholine, which is abundant in the cell membrane. The encoded protein may also play a role in phospholipid remodelling, arachidonic acid release, nitric oxide-induced or vasopressin-induced arachidonic acid release and in leukotriene and prostaglandin synthesis, Fas receptor-mediated apoptosis, and transmembrane ion flux in glucose-stimulated B-cells.

It addition, it has a role in cardiolipin (CL) deacylation, and is required for both speed and directionality of monocyte MCP1/CCL2-induced chemotaxis through regulation of F-actin polymerization at the pseudopods. Isoform ankyrin-iPLA2-1 and isoform ankyrin-iPLA2-2, which lack the catalytic domain, are probably involved in the negative regulation of PLA2G6 activity. Several transcript variants encoding multiple isoforms have been described, but the full-length nature of only two of them have been determined to date.

== Catalytic activity ==
Phosphatidylcholine + H_{2}O = 1-acylglycerophosphocholine + a carboxylate.

== Clinical significance ==
Mutations in PLA2G6 has been shown to result in mitochondrial deficiencies and associated disorders, including PLA2G6-associated neurodegeneration (PLAN), which has several subtypes and is also known as Neurodegeneration with brain iron accumulation type 2 (NBIA2), other forms of disease are also referred to as Parkinson disease 14 (PARK14), and hereditary spastic paraplegia.

=== PLA2G6-associated neurodegeneration (PLAN) ===
PLA2G6-associated neurodegeneration (PLAN) is a neurodegenerative disorder associated with iron accumulation in the brain, primarily in the basal ganglia. It is characterized by progressive extrapyramidal dysfunction leading to rigidity, dystonia, dysarthria and sensorimotor impairment.

==== Infantile neuroaxonal dystrophy (INAD) ====
The most severe form is called infantile neuroaxonal dystrophy (INAD), also Neurodegeneration with brain iron accumulation type 2A (NBIA2A), and is characterized by pathologic axonal swelling and spheroid bodies in the central nervous system. Onset is within the first 2 years of life with death often by the age of 10 years.

==== Atypical neuroaxonal dystrophy (atypical NAD) ====
A later-childhood onset and more slowly progressive form is called atypical neuraxonal dystrophy (atypical NAD), also Neurodegeneration with brain iron accumulation type 2B (NBIA2B).

==== PLA2G6-related dystonia-parkinsonism ====
An adult-onset disease called PLA2G6-related dystonia-parkinsonism develop dystonia and parkinsonism after earlier normal development, and is also caused by biallelic mutations to PLA2G6.

=== Parkinson disease 14 (PARK14) ===
Parkinson disease 14 (PARK14) is an adult-onset progressive neurodegenerative disorder characterized by parkinsonism, dystonia, severe cognitive decline, cerebral and cerebellar atrophy and absent iron in the basal ganglia on magnetic resonance imaging.

=== Hereditary spastic paraplegia ===
Hereditary spastic paraplegias are a diverse class of hereditary degenerative spinal cord disorders characterized by a slow, gradual, progressive weakness and spasticity (stiffness) of the legs. Initial symptoms may include difficulty with balance, weakness and stiffness in the legs, muscle spasms, and dragging the toes when walking. In some forms of the disorder, bladder symptoms (such as incontinence) may appear, or the weakness and stiffness may spread to other parts of the body. Rate of progression and the severity of symptoms are quite variable.

Another disease associated with mutations in this gene is infantile neuroaxonal dystrophy.

== Interactions ==
PLA2G6 has been shown to have Protein-protein interactions with the following.

- BAG3
- ARF1
- CALM1
- HNRNPL
