= Infantile neuroaxonal dystrophy =

- Other names: INAD, Seitelberger disease
- Infantile neuroaxonal dystrophy has an autosomal recessive pattern of inheritance.
- Specialty: Neurology
- Usual onset: Six months to two year of age

Infantile neuroaxonal dystrophy (INAD) is a rare pervasive developmental disorder that primarily affects the nervous system. Individuals with infantile neuroaxonal dystrophy typically do not have any symptoms at birth, but between the ages of about 6 and 18 months they begin to experience delays in acquiring new motor and intellectual skills, such as crawling or beginning to speak. Eventually, they lose previously acquired skills.

== Cause ==
This condition is inherited in an autosomal recessive pattern, which means two copies of the gene (PLA2G6) in each cell are altered. Most often, the parents of an individual with an autosomal recessive disorder each carry one copy of the altered gene but do not show signs and symptoms of the disorder.

== Pathophysiology ==
Mutations in the PLA2G6 gene have been identified in most individuals with infantile neuroaxonal dystrophy. The PLA2G6 gene provides instructions for making an enzyme called an A2 phospholipase. This enzyme family is involved in metabolizing phospholipids. Phospholipid metabolism is important for many body processes, including helping to keep the cell membrane intact and functioning properly. Specifically, the A2 phospholipase produced from the PLA2G6 gene, sometimes called PLA2 group VI, helps to regulate the levels of a compound called phosphatidylcholine, which is abundant in the cell membrane.

Mutations in the PLA2G6 gene impair the function of the PLA2 group VI enzyme. This impairment of enzyme function may disrupt cell membrane maintenance and contribute to the development of spheroid bodies in the nerve axons. Although it is unknown how changes in this enzyme's function lead to the signs and symptoms of infantile neuroaxonal dystrophy, phospholipid metabolism problems have been seen in both this disorder and a related disorder called pantothenate kinase-associated neurodegeneration. These disorders, as well as the more common Alzheimer disease and Parkinson disease, also are associated with changes in brain iron metabolism. Researchers are studying the links between phospholipid defects, brain iron, and damage to nerve cells, but have not determined how the iron accumulation that occurs in some individuals with infantile neuroaxonal dystrophy may contribute to the features of this disorder.

A few individuals with infantile neuroaxonal dystrophy have not been found to have mutations in the PLA2G6 gene. The genetic cause of the condition in these cases is unknown; there is evidence that at least one other gene may be involved.

Mutations in the NAGA gene, resulting in alpha-N-acetylgalactosaminidase deficiency, cause an infantile neuroaxonal dystrophy known as Schindler disease.

== Diagnosis ==
In some cases, signs and symptoms of infantile neuroaxonal dystrophy first appear later in childhood or during the teenage years and progress more slowly. Children with infantile neuroaxonal dystrophy experience progressive difficulties with movement. Generally they have muscles that are at first weak and "floppy" (hypotonic), and then gradually become very stiff (spastic). Eventually, affected children lose the ability to move independently. Lack of muscle strength causes difficulty with feeding and breathing problems that can lead to frequent infections, such as pneumonia. Seizures occur in some affected children.

Rapid, involuntary eye movements (nystagmus), eyes that do not look in the same direction (strabismus), and vision loss due to deterioration (atrophy) of the optic nerve are characteristic of infantile neuroaxonal dystrophy. Hearing loss may also develop. Children with this disorder experience progressive deterioration of cognitive functions (dementia), and eventually lose awareness of their surroundings.

Infantile neuroaxonal dystrophy is characterized by the development of swellings called spheroid bodies in the axons, the fibers that extend from nerve cells (neurons) and transmit impulses to muscles and other neurons. A part of the brain called the cerebellum, which helps to control movements, may also be damaged. In some individuals with infantile neuroaxonal dystrophy, abnormal amounts of iron accumulate in a specific region of the brain called the basal ganglia.

== Management ==
Currently, only palliative treatment is available: alleviation of spasticity and seizures, baclofen for relieving dystonia, physiotherapeutic treatment and measures such as gastric feeding tube or tracheostomy to prevent aspirational pneumonia.

== Research ==
An open-label clinical study for long-term evaluation of efficacy, safety, tolerability, and pharmacokinetics of a deuterium-enhanced polyunsaturated fatty acid RT001, which, when taken with food, can protect the neuronal cells from degeneration, started in the Summer 2018.

The loss of iPLA2-VIA, the fly homolog of PLA2G6, reduces lifespan, impairs synaptic transmission, and causes neurodegeneration. Phospholipases typically hydrolyze glycerol phospholipids, but loss of iPLA2-VIA does not affect the phospholipid composition of brain tissue but rather causes an elevation in ceramides. Reducing ceramides with drugs, including myriocin or desipramine, alleviates lysosomal stress and suppresses neurodegeneration.
