= Reata (disambiguation) =

Reata is another term for a lasso.

Reata may also refer to:

- Reata (comics), a fictional character
- Reata Pharmaceuticals, an American company
- Reata Restaurant, an American group of restaurants
- Reata, a fictional cattle ranch featured in the 1956 film Giant
