= KEAP1 =

Protein-coding gene in the species Homo sapiens

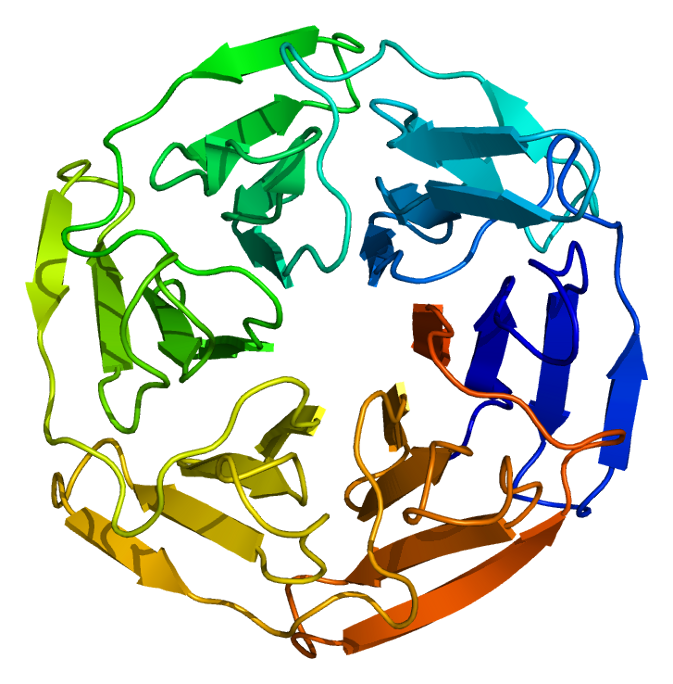

Identifiers
- Aliases: KEAP1, INrf2, KLHL19, kelch like ECH associated protein 1
- External IDs: OMIM: 606016; MGI: 1858732; GeneCards: KEAP1
Available structures
PDB	Ortholog search: PDBe RCSB
PDB	List of PDB id codes 1U6D, 1ZGK, 2FLU, 3VNG, 3VNH, 3ZGC, 3ZGD, 4CXI, 4CXJ, 4CXT, 4IFJ, 4IFL, 4IFN, 4IN4, 4IQK, 4L7B, 4L7C, 4L7D, 4N1B, 4XMB

Gene location (Human)
Chr.	Chromosome 19 (human)
Band	19p13.2	Start	10,486,125 bp
Band	19p13.2	End	10,503,558 bp

Gene location (Mouse)
Chr.	Chromosome 9 (mouse)
Band	9|9 A3	Start	21,141,026 bp
Band	9|9 A3	End	21,150,657 bp
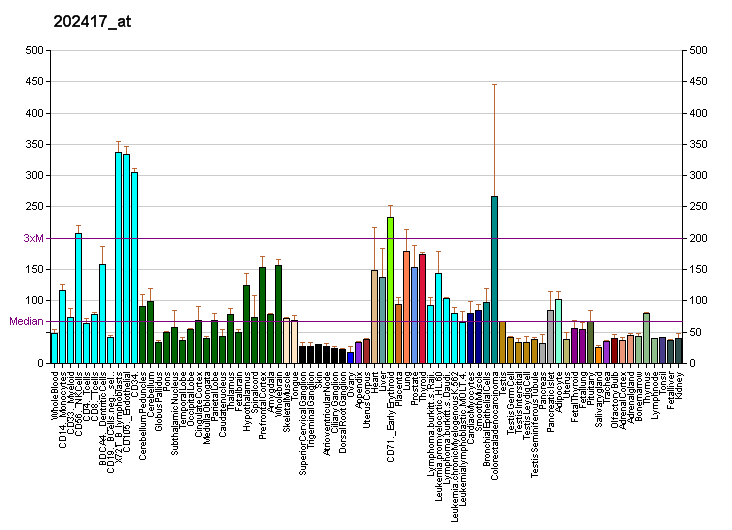
RNA expression pattern
Bgee	Human / Mouse (ortholog); Top expressed in: muscle of thigh; gastrocnemius muscle; apex of heart; Skeletal muscle tissue of rectus abdominis; stromal cell of endometrium; quadriceps femoris muscle; vastus lateralis muscle; C1 segment; glutes; Skeletal muscle tissue of biceps brachii / Top expressed in: supraoptic nucleus; ascending aorta; muscle of thigh; aortic valve; trigeminal ganglion; Paneth cell; arcuate nucleus; renal corpuscle; dorsal tegmental nucleus; skeletal muscle tissue; More reference expression data
BioGPS	More reference expression data
Gene ontology
Molecular function	transcription factor binding; ubiquitin-protein transferase activity; protein binding; protein homodimerization activity; disordered domain specific binding; identical protein binding
Cellular component	cytoplasm; Cul3-RING ubiquitin ligase complex; nucleoplasm; microtubule organizing center; midbody; endoplasmic reticulum; actin filament; nucleus; cytosol; protein-containing complex
Biological process	cellular response to interleukin-4; regulation of epidermal cell differentiation; regulation of transcription, DNA-templated; in utero embryonic development; proteasomal ubiquitin-independent protein catabolic process; negative regulation of DNA-binding transcription factor activity; transcription, DNA-templated; protein ubiquitination; positive regulation of proteasomal ubiquitin-dependent protein catabolic process; cytoplasmic sequestering of transcription factor; protein deubiquitination; post-translational protein modification; viral process
Sources:Amigo / QuickGO
Orthologs
Databases	NCBI: entry; OMA: entry
Species	Human	Mouse
Entrez	9817	50868
Ensembl	ENSG00000079999	ENSMUSG00000003308
UniProt	Q14145	Q9Z2X8
RefSeq (mRNA)	NM_012289; NM_203500	NM_001110305; NM_001110306; NM_001110307; NM_016679
RefSeq (protein)	NP_036421; NP_987096	NP_001103775; NP_001103776; NP_001103777; NP_057888
Location (UCSC)	Chr 19: 10.49 – 10.5 Mb	Chr 9: 21.14 – 21.15 Mb
PubMed search
- Wikidata
View/Edit Human	View/Edit Mouse

Kelch-like ECH-associated protein 1 is an E3 ubiquitin ligase that in humans is encoded by the Keap1 gene.

== Structure ==
Keap1 has four discrete protein domains. The N-terminal Broad complex, Tramtrack and Bric-à-Brac (BTB) domain contains the Cys151 residue, which is one of the important cysteines in stress sensing. The intervening region (IVR) domain contains two critical cysteine residues, Cys273 and Cys288, which are a second group of cysteines important for stress sensing. A double glycine repeat (DGR) and C-terminal region domains collaborate to form a β-propeller structure, which is where Keap1 interacts with Nrf2.

== Function ==
Keap1 functions as a negative regulator of Nrf2, a master regulator of the cellular antioxidant response that contributes to protection against oxidative stress.

Under quiescent conditions, Nrf2 is retained in the cytoplasm through association with Keap1, which promotes ubiquitination and subsequent proteolysis of Nrf2. This sequestration and degradation mechanism mediates repression of Nrf2-dependent transcriptional activity.

Keap1 has been characterized as both a tumor suppressor gene and a metastasis suppressor gene.

== Interactions ==
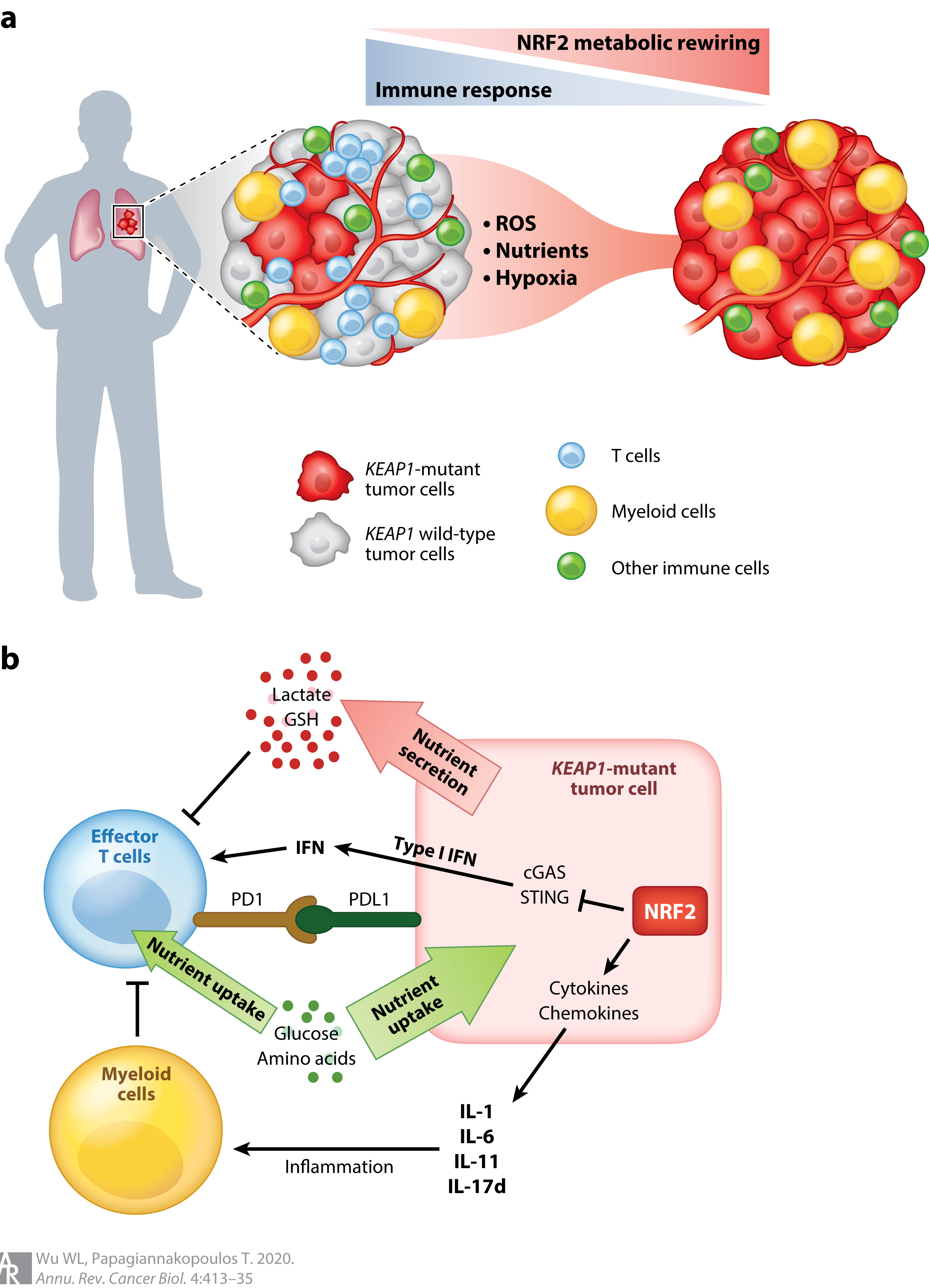
The KEAP1/NRF2 pathway modulates the body's antitumor response

Keap1 has been shown to interact with Nrf2.

Several studies have identified an autoregulatory circuit linking KEAP1 and NRF2 expression. In mouse Keap1 (INrf2), Lee and colleagues identified an antioxidant response element (ARE) located on the negative strand that links Nrf2 activation to Keap1 transcription.

Analysis of NRF2 occupancy in human lymphocytes identified an approximately 700 bp region within the KEAP1 promoter as highly enriched for NRF2 binding.

These findings support reciprocal regulation between NRF2 and KEAP1. NRF2-driven KEAP1 expression has subsequently been characterized in human cancers, particularly squamous cell cancers, providing additional insight into regulation of NRF2 signaling.

== Clinical significance ==
=== Mutations ===
Mutations in KEAP1 that result in loss-of-function are not linked to familial cancers, though they do predispose individuals to multinodular goiters. The proposed mechanism leading to goiter formation is that the redox stress experienced when the thyroid produces hormones selects for loss of heterozygosity of KEAP1, leading to the goiters.

=== As a drug target ===
Because Nrf2 activation leads to a coordinated antioxidant and anti-inflammatory response, and Keap1 represses Nrf2 activation, Keap1 has become a very attractive drug target.

A series of synthetic oleane triterpenoid compounds, known as antioxidant inflammation modulators (AIMs), are being developed by Reata Pharmaceuticals, Inc. and are potent inducers of the Keap1-Nrf2 pathway, blocking Keap1-dependent Nrf2 ubiquitination and leading to the stabilization and nuclear translocation of Nrf2 and subsequent induction of Nrf2 target genes. The lead compound in this series, bardoxolone methyl (also known as CDDO-Me or RTA 402), was in late-stage clinical trials for the treatment of chronic kidney disease (CKD) in patients with type 2 diabetes mellitus and showed an ability to improve markers of renal function in these patients. However, the Phase 3 trial was halted due to safety concerns.

== Gallery ==
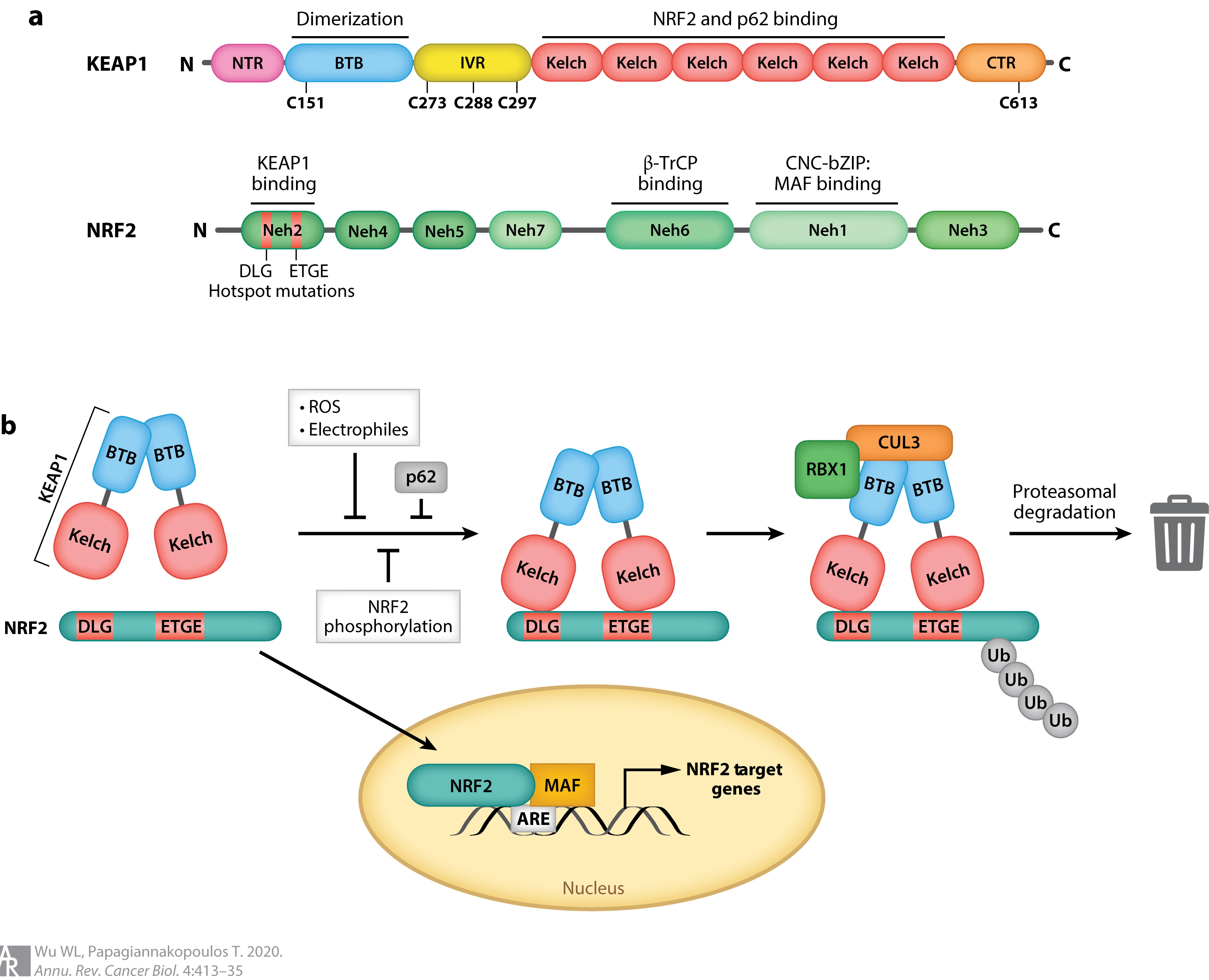
(a) NRF2 and KEAP1 protein domains; (b) KEAP1 homodimerizes through the BTB domain, and through the Kelch domains KEAP1 interacts with NRF2 at the ETGE and DLG motifs

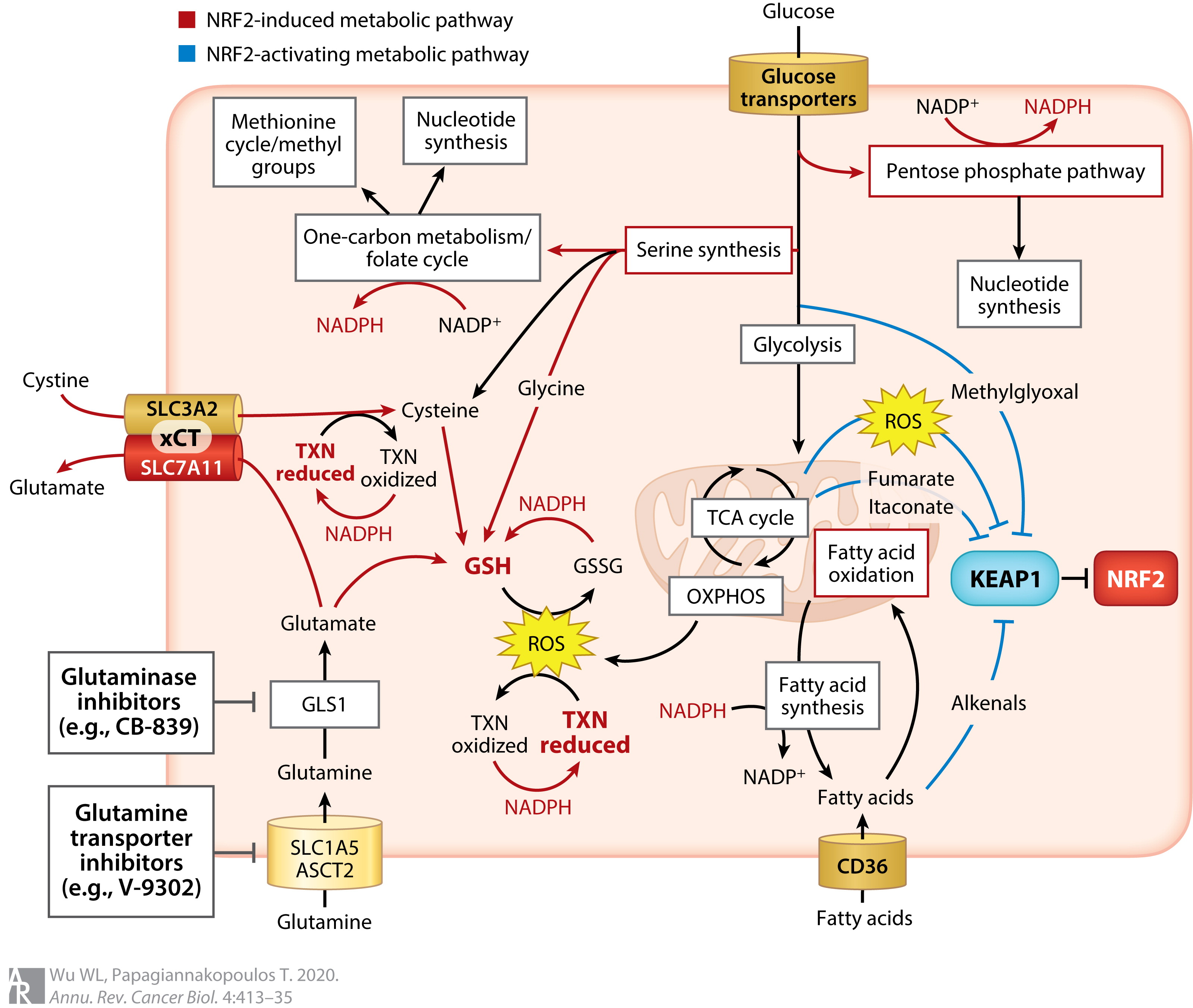
The relationship of the NRF2/KEAP1 pathway with cellular metabolism
