= Kyle Bryant =

Athlete, speaker

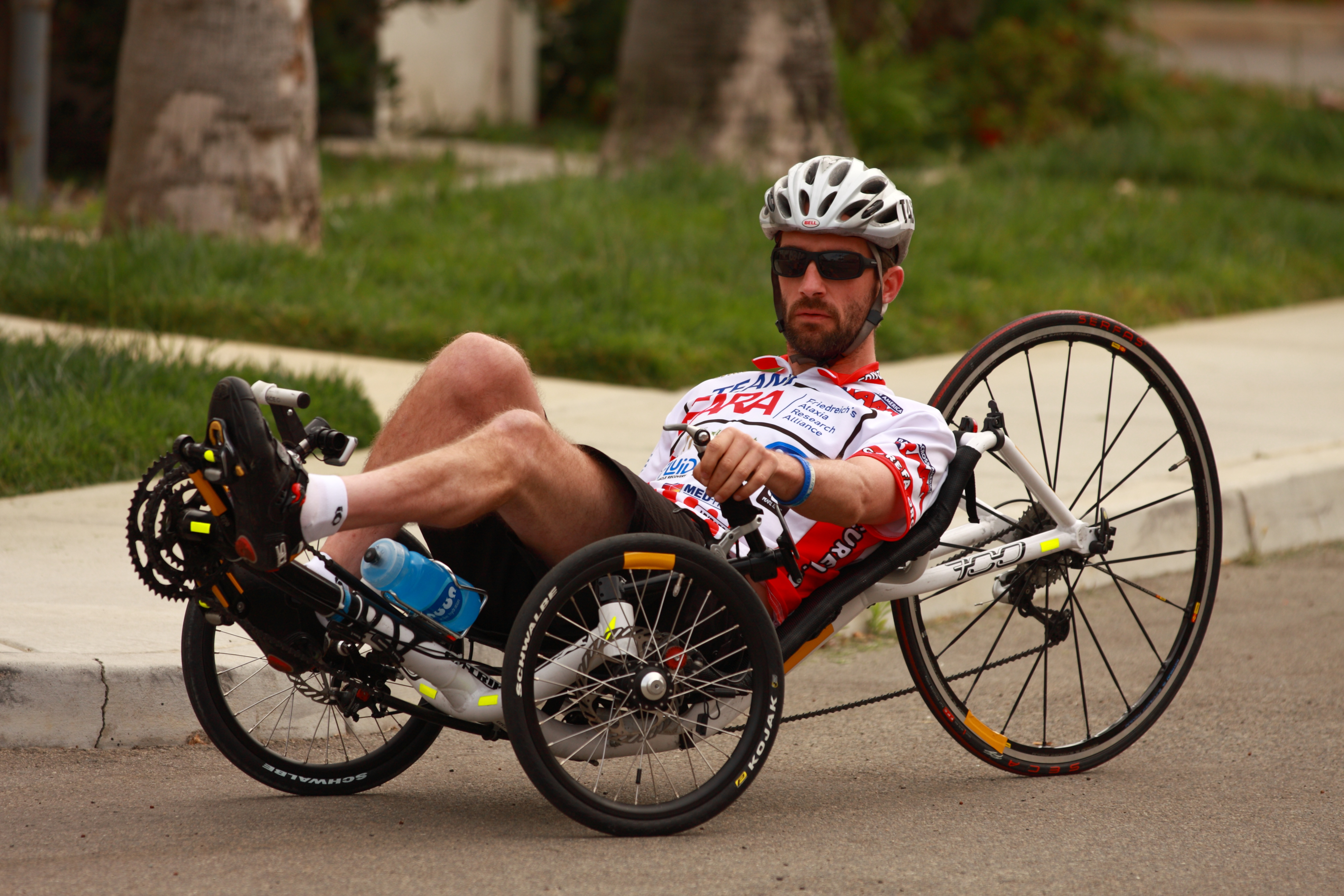
- Kyle Bryant training on his recumbent bicycle.
- Born: October 5, 1981 (age 44); Auburn, California
- Education: University of California, Davis
- Occupations: Founder, Director (business)
- Parents: Mike Bryant (father); Diane Bryant (mother)

Kyle Bryant (October 5, 1981) is an athlete, speaker and the spokesperson for the Friedreich's Ataxia Research Alliance (FARA). Bryant is the founder and event director of rideATAXIA – a nationwide bike ride fundraiser benefiting FARA.

== Early life ==
Bryant was born in Auburn, California to Mike and Diane Bryant. He has a brother Collin (born 1979) who is a firefighter.

== Diagnosis ==
Bryant was diagnosed at age 17 with Friedreich's ataxia, a rare, life-shortening, degenerative neuromuscular disorder. About one in 50,000 people in the United States have FA. Friedreich's ataxia is a genetic disorder with symptoms including muscle weakness, loss of coordination, vision impairment, slurred speech, hearing loss, scoliosis (curvature of the spine), and a life-shortening heart condition. The disorder is progressive, and most young people diagnosed need the aid of a cane, walker, or wheelchair by their teens or early 20s.

== rideATAXIA ==
Bryant founded rideATAXIA in 2007 with a 2,500-mile, 59-day ride from San Diego, California to Memphis TN. The goal of the ride was to raise awareness and research funds for Friedreich's Ataxia (FA). The first rideATAXIA took place between January 22 and March 21, 2007, when Bryant and his father, Mike Bryant, rode their bikes from San Diego, California to the National Ataxia Foundation (NAF) annual membership meeting in Memphis, Tennessee.

The mission of rideATAXIA is to educate the public about FA by drawing attention through acts of physical endurance, enable the advancement of FA research through collaborative financial support, and empower others with ataxia by inspiring, motivating, and providing opportunities to develop physical and mental strength.

During the first ride, the team raised more than $40,000 and helped unite the National Ataxia Foundation (NAF) and Freidreich's Ataxia Research Alliance (FARA). Both NAF and FARA contributed matching funds, and helped to create the Kyle Bryant Translational Research Award in 2007. This is an annual award that provides opportunities for applicants to request a budget of up to $250,000 per year for one or two years.

Nationally, rideATAXIA has raised over $6 million for FA research. Currently rideATAXIA holds six annual events in five states, and has raised over a million each year in 2016 & 2017.

In 2010, Bryant participated in the Race Across America (RAAM) as part of 4-man Team FARA. The team completed the 3000 mile non-stop race from San Diego, California to Annapolis, Maryland in 8 days, 8 hours, and 14 minutes. The race was the subject of the documentary film The Ataxian.

== FARA ==
Bryant became the spokesperson for FARA, a non-profit, charitable organization dedicated to accelerating research leading to treatments and a cure for Friedreich's ataxia. With Bryant as the program director and Outback Steakhouse as the presenting sponsor, FARA began to build a network of single day family friendly rides all across the nation. Currently, there are five different rideAtaxia events across the country: Northern California, Dallas, Orlando, Philadelphia, and Chicago.

== Media activities ==
In December 2016 Bryant launched the biweekly Two Disabled Dudes Podcast with his RAAM teammate, and fellow FA patient Sean Baumstark.

Kyle wrote an autobiography in 2019 Shifting into High Gear

== Awards ==
In 2013, Bryant was featured as one of Barefoot Wine's "Soles of the Year."
