= PIP5K1B =

Protein-coding gene in the species Homo sapiens

Identifiers
- Aliases: PIP5K1B, MSS4, STM7, phosphatidylinositol-4-phosphate 5-kinase type 1 beta
- External IDs: OMIM: 602745; MGI: 107930; GeneCards: PIP5K1B
Enzyme activity
EC #	BRENDA	ExPASy	KEGG	MetaCyc
2.7.1.68	↗	↗	↗	↗

Gene location (Human)
Chr.	Chromosome 9 (human)
Band	9q21.11	Start	68,705,240 bp
Band	9q21.11	End	69,009,176 bp

Gene location (Mouse)
Chr.	Chromosome 19 (mouse)
Band	19|19 B	Start	24,272,158 bp
Band	19|19 B	End	24,533,236 bp
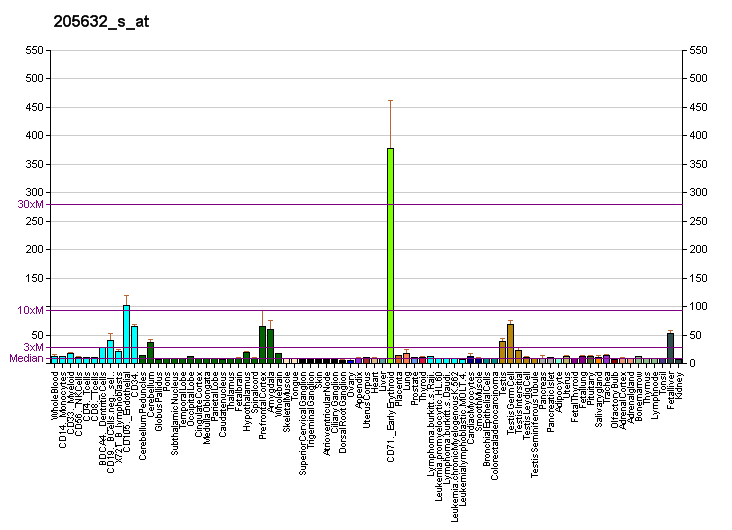
RNA expression pattern
Bgee	Human / Mouse (ortholog); Top expressed in: Epithelium of choroid plexus; jejunal mucosa; mucosa of ileum; mucosa of colon; mucosa of sigmoid colon; rectum; duodenum; cardiac muscle tissue of right atrium; gonad; myocardium of left ventricle / Top expressed in: choroid plexus of fourth ventricle; saccule; Epithelium of choroid plexus; parotid gland; retinal pigment epithelium; otic placode; crypt of lieberkuhn of small intestine; otic vesicle; granulocyte; CA3 field; More reference expression data
BioGPS	More reference expression data
Gene ontology
Molecular function	transferase activity; nucleotide binding; protein binding; phosphatidylinositol phosphate kinase activity; ATP binding; kinase activity; 1-phosphatidylinositol-4-phosphate 5-kinase activity; 1-phosphatidylinositol-5-kinase activity; 1-phosphatidylinositol-3-phosphate 5-kinase activity; 1-phosphatidylinositol-3-phosphate 4-kinase activity; phosphatidylinositol-3,4-bisphosphate 5-kinase activity
Cellular component	uropod; membrane; endomembrane system; cytosol
Biological process	phosphatidylinositol phosphate biosynthetic process; phosphatidylinositol metabolic process; phosphorylation; phosphatidylinositol biosynthetic process; regulation of phosphatidylinositol 3-kinase signaling
Sources:Amigo / QuickGO
Orthologs
Databases	NCBI: entry; OMA: entry
Species	Human	Mouse
Entrez	8395	18719
Ensembl	ENSG00000107242	ENSMUSG00000024867
UniProt	O14986	P70181
RefSeq (mRNA)	NM_001031687; NM_001278253; NM_003558; NM_001376036; NM_001376037 NM_001376039; NM_001376040; NM_001376041	NM_008846
RefSeq (protein)	NP_001265182; NP_003549; NP_001362965; NP_001362966; NP_001362968 NP_001362969; NP_001362970	NP_032872
Location (UCSC)	Chr 9: 68.71 – 69.01 Mb	Chr 19: 24.27 – 24.53 Mb
PubMed search
- Wikidata
View/Edit Human	View/Edit Mouse

Phosphatidylinositol-4-phosphate 5-kinase type-1 beta is an enzyme that in humans is encoded by the PIP5K1B gene.

Abnormal silencing of the PIP5K1B gene contributes to the cytoskeletal defects seen in Friedreich's ataxia.
