= Fiona Cauley =

American stand-up comedian

- Born: Tennessee, U.S.

Comedy career
- Years active: 2019–present
- Medium: Stand-up, podcasts, television
- Genres: Observational comedy, dark comedy
- Subjects: Disability, dating, everyday life

Fiona Cauley is an American stand-up comedian working out of Nashville, Tennessee. She has Friedreich's ataxia, a hereditary disorder of the nervous system, and has built much of her act around living with the condition. Cauley became widely known as a frequent guest on the comedy podcast Kill Tony, where she won a "Golden Ticket", and she was named the best comedian in the 2024 edition of the Nashville Scene's Best of Nashville awards. In 2025 she performed a stand-up set on The Tonight Show Starring Jimmy Fallon.

== Early life ==
Cauley is from Tennessee and is based in Nashville. She was diagnosed with Friedreich's ataxia at the age of 18. The condition is progressive, and her mobility declined over several years: she walked during high school, used a cane and later a walker during college, and began using a wheelchair in her mid-twenties. She uses a power wheelchair for mobility.

== Career ==
Cauley began performing stand-up comedy in 2019. She became a regular performer at Zanies Comedy Club in Nashville.

She gained wider attention through appearances on the live comedy podcast Kill Tony, where she won a "Golden Ticket". Her disability-centered material drew viral attention online, and she has gone on to headline comedy shows across the United States. Her comedy frequently addresses her disability directly; on her website, she has invited audiences to laugh, framing the wheelchair as a subject of her act rather than something to be avoided.

In October 2024, Nashville Scene named Cauley Best Comedian in its Best of Nashville awards, describing her as a rising local comic with a growing national profile. In 2025, the British news magazine The Week included her in a roundup of comedians to see on tour.

In June 2025, Cauley took part in a fireside chat titled "Laughing at Doom: Using Humour to Talk about Illness/Hellscapes" on the main stage of the Cannes Lions International Festival of Creativity, appearing alongside television personality Bill Nye and a Biogen executive as part of an awareness campaign for Friedreich's ataxia developed with the agency 21Grams. She has also toured with comedian Nikki Glaser.

In November 2025, Cauley made her stand-up debut on The Tonight Show Starring Jimmy Fallon, appearing in an episode alongside the Jonas Brothers, actor Matthew Rhys and basketball player A'ja Wilson.

== Comedy ==
Cauley's act is characterized as dark and punchline-driven, drawing on subjects including disability, dating and everyday life. She has said that one of her challenges as a performer is signaling to audiences that it is acceptable to laugh at material about her condition, and she uses comedy to raise awareness of Friedreich's ataxia and disability more broadly.

== Personal life ==
Cauley lives in Nashville.
