= Harding ataxia =

- Other names: Early onset cerebellar ataxia with retained reflexes (EOCARR)
- Harding ataxia has an autosomal recessive pattern of inheritance.
- Specialty: Neurology

Harding ataxia is an autosomal recessive cerebellar ataxia originally described by Harding in 1981. This form of cerebellar ataxia is similar to Friedreich ataxia including that it results in poor reflexes and balance, but differs in several ways, including the absence of diabetes mellitus, optic atrophy, cardiomyopathy, skeletal abnormalities, and the fact that tendon reflexes in the arms and knees remain intact. This form of ataxia is characterized by onset in the first 20 years, and is less severe than Friedreich ataxia. Additional cases were diagnosed in 1989, 1990, 1991, and 1998.

== Cases ==
40 cases were diagnosed in northern Italy between 1940 and 1990. The gene frequency for this autosomal recessive condition was estimated at 1 in 218. In 1989, 16 cases on EOCA were diagnosed in children with a mean onset age of 7.1 In 1990, 20 patients affected by EOCA were studied. It was found that the ataxia of this study's participants affected the pyramidal tracts and peripheral nerves.

== See also ==
- Cerebellar ataxia
- Friedreich ataxia
