= The Ataxian =

Life story of Kyle Bryant with Friedreich's ataxia

- Directed by: Zack Bennett, Kevin Schlanser
- Starring: Kyle Bryant, Sean Baumstark, John Lockwood, Mike Mellott
- Production company: Redwood Creek Entertainment
- Release date: 6 June 2015
- Running time: 74 minutes

The Ataxian is a documentary film of Kyle Bryant, a sufferer of Friedreich's ataxia. The film premiered at the Dances With Films Festival in 2015.

== Synopsis ==
The movie tells how Bryant lost the ability to play his favorite sports and walk. Bryant takes up cycling, biking long distances.

When Bryant is finally relegated to a wheelchair, he enlists the help of three friends and they embark on the Race Across America.

The outcome inspires a movement, known as rideATAXIA.
