= Friedreich's Ataxia Research Alliance =

Organization to research Friedreich's ataxia

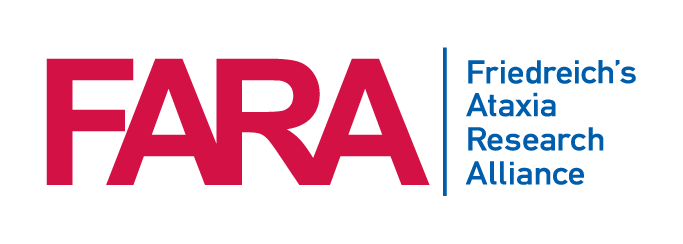
- Founded: 1998
- Founders: Ronald J Bartek, Raychel Bartek
- Legal status: 501(c)(3) nonprofit organization
- Headquarters: Downingtown, PA
- Services: Grantmaking for medical research; public awareness and education
- Chairman: Paul Avery
- President: Ron Bartek
- CEO: Jen Farmer
- Revenue: $13,135,426 (2024)
- Expenses: $13,277,236 (2024)
- Website: www.curefa.org

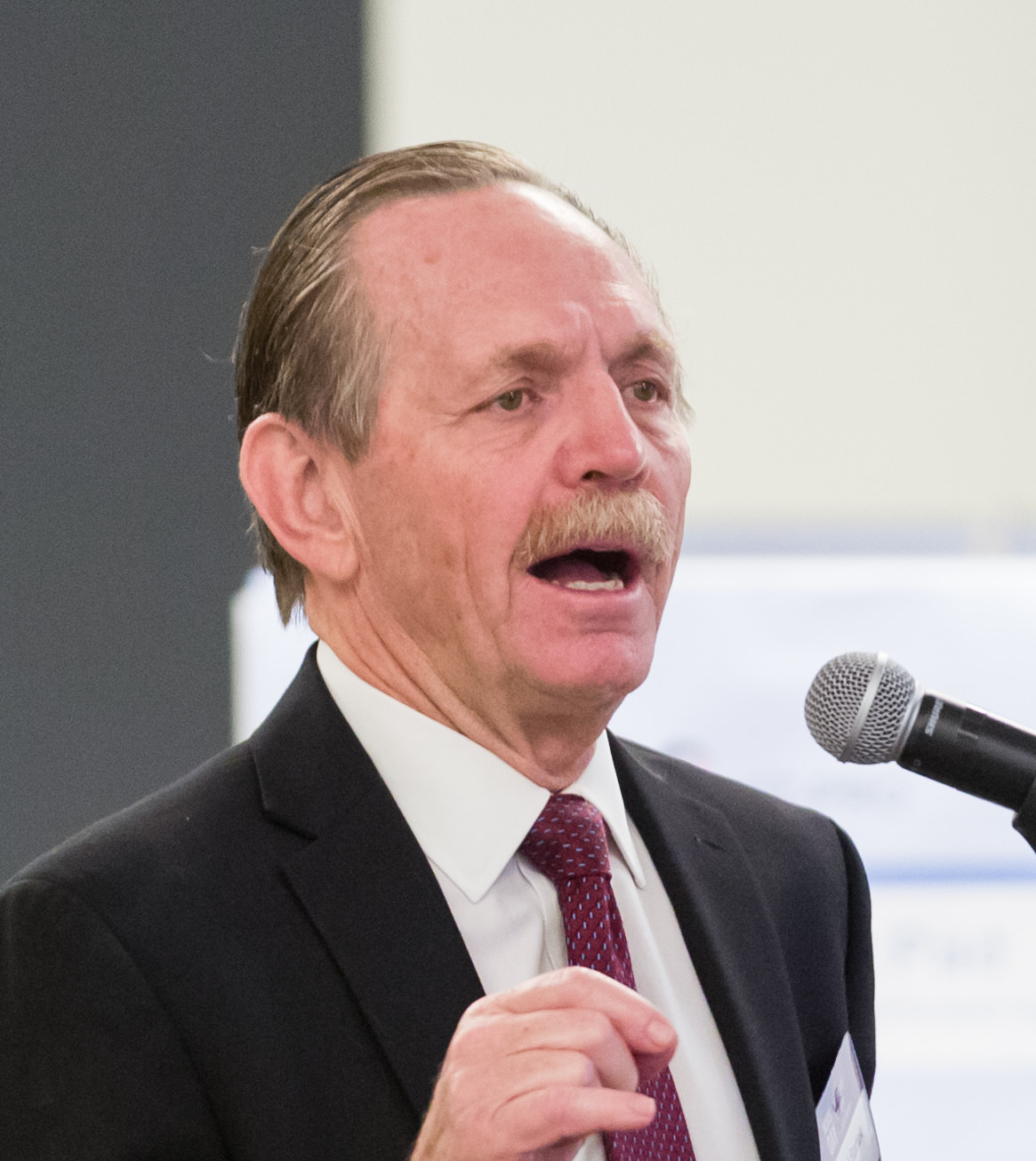
Co-founder Ronald J. Bartek in 2017

The Friedreich's Ataxia Research Alliance (FARA) is a 501(c)(3), non-profit, tax-exempt organization formed to support the research on Friedreich's ataxia. It was formed in 1998 by Ron and Raychel Bartek. FARA's turnover in 2017 was $7.3 million with over 98% spent on programs. It has had a Four Star rating from Charity Navigator since 2011. Research is also advanced by its partnership with the Muscular Dystrophy Association. FARA organizes various cycling fundraising events One of the biggest events is the RideAtaxia which is a sponsored bicycle ride in various locations akin to Race for the Cure. The organization maintains a large patient registry.

== Research ==
FARA maintains the Friedreich's Ataxia Clinical Outcome Measures Study (FACOMS), a longitudinal natural-history study of people with Friedreich's ataxia. Natural-history data from FACOMS were used in the propensity-matched analysis that supported the 2023 U.S. Food and Drug Administration approval of omaveloxolone (marketed as Skyclarys), the first treatment approved specifically for Friedreich's ataxia. FARA has stated that research it funded and the participation of patient families in clinical trials and natural-history studies contributed to the drug's development.
