= Stomping gait =

Abnormal pattern of walking

Stomping gait (or sensory ataxia gait) is a form of gait abnormality. It indicates involvement of posterior column. Posterior column carries proprioception which is essential for coordination of motor movements.

== Presentation ==
Uncoordinated walking

== Conditions associated with a stomping gait ==
- Friedreich's ataxia
- Pernicious anemia
- Tabes dorsalis
- Peripheral neuropathy
- Spinal cord disease
- Multiple sclerosis
