= DT-216P2 =

Investigational drug for Friedreich's ataxia

DT-216P2 is an investigational small-molecule drug candidate developed by Design Therapeutics for the treatment of Friedreich's ataxia (FA). It is a "GeneTAC" (gene-targeted chimera) compound designed to increase expression of frataxin by targeting the expanded GAA trinucleotide repeat in the FXN gene, the genetic cause of the disease. As of 2026 it is in Phase 1/2 clinical testing and has not been approved for medical use in any country.

DT-216P2 is a reformulation of the first-generation candidate DT-216, developed after injection-site reactions limited the earlier compound. It can be administered by intravenous infusion or by subcutaneous injection or infusion.

== Mechanism of action ==
DT-216P2 is based on Design Therapeutics' GeneTAC platform of gene-targeted chimera small molecules. The molecule combines a programmable DNA-binding moiety that targets the expanded GAA repeat within the FXN gene with a tethered ligand that recruits the cell's own transcriptional machinery, helping to overcome the transcriptional block caused by the repeat expansion and thereby restoring production of endogenous frataxin messenger RNA and protein. The compound is intended to address the underlying cause of FA by raising frataxin levels rather than treating symptoms.

== Development ==
The first-generation candidate, DT-216, was evaluated in Phase 1 single-ascending-dose and multiple-ascending-dose trials in adults with FA. In March 2022, the FDA granted DT-216 Fast Track designation for the treatment of FA. While DT-216 produced statistically significant, dose-related increases in frataxin mRNA in skeletal muscle, several patients experienced injection-site thrombophlebitis attributed to formulation excipients, leading Design Therapeutics to reformulate the drug.

In March 2024 the company announced the new formulation, DT-216P2 (distinguished from the original formulation, retrospectively termed DT-216P1), reporting greater than tenfold and more sustained drug exposure together with an improved injection-site safety profile in nonclinical studies. Good Laboratory Practice studies were completed in 2024, and a Phase 1 single-ascending-dose study in healthy volunteers began in Australia in early 2025.

Design Therapeutics submitted an Investigational New Drug (IND) application for DT-216P2 to the U.S. Food and Drug Administration (FDA); the FDA placed the application on clinical hold, citing nonclinical deficiencies.

== RESTORE-FA trial ==
RESTORE-FA (Reactivating Expression Suppressed Through Overcoming Repeat Expansion for FA) is an ongoing Phase 1/2 multiple-ascending-dose trial evaluating the safety, pharmacokinetics, pharmacodynamics and exploratory clinical effects of DT-216P2 in patients with FA. Patient dosing began outside the United States, in Australia, in 2025.

In May 2026, Design Therapeutics reported data on 16 patients who had completed four weeks of weekly intravenous dosing across four dose cohorts (0.1, 0.3, 0.6 and 1 mg/kg). According to the company, patients in the highest-dose cohort showed mean improvements from baseline of 6.4 points on the modified Friedreich's Ataxia Rating Scale (mFARS) and increases in endogenous frataxin, including a 65% rise in whole-blood frataxin mRNA and a 42% rise in muscle frataxin mRNA. The drug was described as generally well tolerated, with no serious adverse events; transient, asymptomatic elevations of alanine transaminase were observed in three patients. The company stated that it intended to pursue a registrational development path and to provide further plans in the fourth quarter of 2026.
