= Bardoxolone methyl =

Chemical compound

Clinical data
- Routes of administration: Oral
- ATC code: none

Legal status
- Legal status: Investigational

Identifiers
- IUPAC name: Methyl 2-cyano-3,12-dioxooleana-1,9(11)dien-28-oate
- CAS Number: 218600-53-4
- PubChem CID: 400769
- IUPHAR/BPS: 3443
- ChemSpider: 355161
- UNII: CEG1Q6OGU1
- ChEMBL: ChEMBL1762621
- CompTox Dashboard (EPA): DTXSID5048764
- ECHA InfoCard: 100.132.153

Chemical and physical data
- Formula: C_{32}H_{43}NO_{4}
- Molar mass: 505.699 g·mol^{−1}
- 3D model (JSmol): Interactive image
- SMILES: O=C4C(\C#N)=C/[C@@]5(/C3=C/C(=O)[C@H]2[C@](CC[C@@]1(C(=O)OC)CCC(C)(C)C[C@H]12)(C)[C@]3(C)CC[C@H]5C4(C)C)C
- InChI: InChI=1S/C32H43NO4/c1-27(2)11-13-32(26(36)37-8)14-12-31(7)24(20(32)17-27)21(34)15-23-29(5)16-19(18-33)25(35)28(3,4)22(29)9-10-30(23,31)6/h15-16,20,22,24H,9-14,17H2,1-8H3/t20-,22-,24-,29-,30+,31+,32-/m0/s1; Key:WPTTVJLTNAWYAO-KPOXMGGZSA-N

Bardoxolone methyl (also known as “RTA 402”, “CDDO-methyl ester”, CDDO-Me, and more formally methyl bardoxolonate) is an experimental and orally-bioavailable semi-synthetic triterpenoid, based on the scaffold of the natural product oleanolic acid. Pre-clinical studies indicate that the compound acts as an activator of the Nrf2 pathway and an inhibitor of the NF-κB pathway. A phase 3 clinical trial evaluating bardoxolone methyl for the treatment of chronic kidney disease (CKD) was terminated in October 2012 after patients treated with the drug were found to have experienced a higher rate of heart-related adverse events, including heart failure, hospitalizations, and deaths.

An advisory committee meeting of experts voted unanimously that bardoxolone methyl was not effective in slowing the progression of chronic kidney disease in Alport syndrome and that its benefits did not outweigh its risks. A Complete Response Letter from FDA stated a similar opinion.

== Clinical development ==
Investigations of bardoxolone methyl have been conducted by Reata Pharmaceuticals in a partnership with Abbvie and Kyowa Hakko Kirin.

The UK based company e-Therapeutics has announced in late 2020 the possible development of Bardoxolone for anti-viral treatment of COVID-19(Coronavirus), and announced a possible phase 3 program to follow (https://www.etherapeutics.co.uk/wp-content/uploads/2021/02/RNAi-Press-Release.pdf accessed 16 Feb 2021).

=== Phase 1 ===
A Phase 1 clinical trial, sponsored by Reata, was conducted to determine the safety profile of and appropriate dosing for subsequent phase II studies, as well as to evaluate antitumor activity in patients with advanced solid tumor or lymphoid malignancy. Grade 3 reversible liver transaminase elevations were reported. The maximum tolerated dose was 900 mg/day. NQO1 mRNA levels, indicative of Nrf2 pathway activation, were increased in peripheral blood mononuclear cells (PBMCs), and tumor biopsies showed decreased levels of NF-κB and cyclin D1. An improvement in estimated glomerular filtration rate (eGFR) in patients treated with bardoxolone methyl was noted, and based on this finding it was suggested by the authors that the drug might be beneficial for patients with CKD.

=== Phase 2 ===
A Reata-funded, Phase 2 multi-center RCT (BEAM) in patients with moderate to severe CKD and type 2 diabetes reported that eGFR was increased (> 10 ml/min/1.73 m^{2}) in patients treated with bardoxolone methyl for 24 months. An analysis of secondary endpoints showed that approximately three-quarters of bardoxolone methyl-treated patients experienced at least a 10 percent increase in eGFR, and one-quarter of the patients had an improvement of 50%. Adverse events in bardoxolone methyl-treated patients were generally manageable and mild to moderate in severity, with muscle spasm being reported most frequently.

In 2014, Reata announced the initiation of a placebo-controlled, multicenter Phase 2 study (LARIAT), to assess the effects of bardoxolone methyl in pulmonary arterial hypertension.

=== Phase 3 ===
A Phase 3 multinational RCT (BEACON) designed to test the effect of bardoxolone methyl on progression to end-stage renal disease or cardiovascular death in patients with stage 4 CKD and type 2 diabetes was initiated by Reata in June 2011 and halted in October 2012 after bardoxolone methyl-treated patients were found to have experienced a higher rate of heart-related adverse events, including heart failure, hospitalizations, and deaths.

A retrospective post-hoc analyses of the Phase 3 data, conducted by Reata, identified prior hospitalization for heart failure and the baseline level of brain natriuretic peptide, a marker of fluid retention, as predictors of heart failure hospitalizations in the BEACON trial. For patients without these baseline characteristics, the risk for heart failure events among bardoxolone methyl- and placebo-treated patients was similar.

== Mechanism of action ==
Bardoxolone methyl is an activator of the KEAP1-Nrf2 pathway in mice. Bardoxolone methyl also inhibits the pro-inflammatory transcription factor NF-κB in a tissue cultured human cell line.
