= Reata Pharmaceuticals =

U.S. healthcare company

Reata Pharmaceuticals, Inc.
- Traded as: Nasdaq: RETA
- Industry: Biotechnology
- Founded: 1 January 2002
- Fate: Acquired by Biogen
- Revenue: ▼US $26.52 million (2019) ▲US $53.59 million (2018)
- Owner: Biogen (2023–present)
- Website: www.reatapharma.com

Reata Pharmaceuticals, Inc. is a pharmaceutical company based in Plano, Texas. Founded in 2002, it is primarily focused on investigating experimental oral antioxidative and anti-inflammatory drugs, which dually activate the antioxidative transcription factor Nrf2 and inhibit the pro-inflammatory transcription factor NF-κB. The last CEO of Reata Pharmaceuticals was J. Warren Huff.

In July 2023, it was announced Reata had been acquired by the Cambridge, Massachusetts-headquartered multinational biotechnology company, Biogen for nearly $6.5 billion. The purchase was completed on September 26 and Reata stock was delisted from the Nasdaq.

== Pipeline ==
The antioxidative and anti-inflammatory compounds bardoxolone methyl and RTA 408 are the lead clinical development compounds in Reata’s portfolio.

=== Bardoxolone Methyl ===
Bardoxolone methyl was one of the first of the class of synthetic triterpenoids to be studied in the clinic. It has been evaluated in Phase 1 studies for cancer, Phase 2 and 3 studies for chronic kidney disease (CKD) associated with type 2 diabetes, and is currently being evaluated in a Phase 2 study for pulmonary arterial hypertension.

=== RTA 408 ===
Omaveloxolone (RTA 408) is a second generation member of the synthetic oleanane triterpenoid compounds. The FDA approved Skyclarys (omoveloxolone) in 2023 for the treatment of Friedreich’s ataxia (FA), a hereditary neurological disorder that strikes during adolescence and leaves patients unable to walk and often cuts short their lives. Skyclarys was also approved in the European Union, Canada, the UK, and Brazil in April 2025.

Skyclarys become the first drug approved for the condition, which affects roughly 5,000 who have been diagnosed in the United States and 22,000 worldwide. Preclinical studies demonstrated that RTA 408 possesses antioxidative and anti-inflammatory activities, as well as the potential to improve mitochondrial bioenergetics. Because of the broad applicability of such effects across many diseases, RTA 408 is currently under clinical investigation in several Phase 2 clinical studies including immunooncology, corneal endothelial cell loss associated with cataract surgery Friedreich’s ataxia, and mitochondrial myopathies.

=== Others ===
Reata was also actively engaged in the discovery of small molecule disease-modifying drugs that function by stabilizing the normal three-dimensional structure of target proteins or generally enhancing the folding environment of the cell. Defects in protein folding underlie a large number of genetic diseases including certain forms of cancer, familial Alzheimer's disease, and cystic fibrosis. Protein folding defects are also believed to play important roles in the development of non-inherited forms of many of these diseases.

== Partnerships ==
Reata has a licensing agreement with Kyowa Hakko Kirin for development and commercialization of bardoxolone methyl for CKD and related indications in Japan, China, Taiwan, Korea, and other select Southeast Asian countries.

Reata also has a licensing agreement with Abbvie for development and commercialization of bardoxolone methyl outside the U.S., excluding Asian markets defined in the agreement with Kyowa Hakko Kirin. Abbvie and Reata also have a second agreement for development of the second generation portfolio of synthetic oleanane triterpenoid compounds, including RTA 408, as well as other Nrf2 activators.
