= Omaveloxolone =

Medication

Clinical data
- Trade names: Skyclarys
- Other names: RTA 408
- AHFS/Drugs.com: Monograph
- License data: US DailyMed: Omaveloxolone
- Routes of administration: By mouth
- ATC code: N07XX25 (WHO)

Legal status
- Legal status: CA: ℞-only; US: ℞-only; EU: Rx-only

Identifiers
- IUPAC name: N-((4aS,6aR,6bS,8aR,12aS,14aR,14bS)-1 1-cyano-2,2,6a,6b,9,9,12a-heptamethyl-10,14-dioxo-1,2,3,4,4a,5,6,6a,6b,7,8,8a,9,10,12a,14,14a,14b- octadecahydropicen-4a-yl)-2,2-difluoropropanamide
- CAS Number: 1474034-05-3
- PubChem CID: 71811910
- IUPHAR/BPS: 7573
- DrugBank: DB12513
- ChemSpider: 34980948
- UNII: G69Z98951Q
- KEGG: D10964
- ChEBI: CHEBI:229661
- CompTox Dashboard (EPA): DTXSID101138251

Chemical and physical data
- Formula: C_{33}H_{44}F_{2}N_{2}O_{3}
- Molar mass: 554.723 g·mol^{−1}
- 3D model (JSmol): Interactive image
- SMILES: O=C4C(\C#N)=C/[C@@]5(/C3=C/C(=O)[C@H]2[C@](CC[C@@]1(NC(=O)C(F)(F)C)CCC(C)(C)C[C@H]12)(C)[C@]3(C)CC[C@H]5C4(C)C)C
- InChI: InChI=1S/C32H43NO4/c1-27(2)11-13-32(26(36)37-8)14-12-31(7)24(20(32)17-27)21(34)15-23-29(5)16-19(18-33)25(35)28(3,4)22(29)9-10-30(23,31)6/h15-16,20,22,24H,9-14,17H2,1-8H3/t20-,22-,24-,29-,30+,31+,32-/m0/s1; Key:WPTTVJLTNAWYAO-KPOXMGGZSA-N

Omaveloxolone, sold under the brand name Skyclarys, is a medication used for the treatment of Friedreich's ataxia. It is taken by mouth.

The most common side effects include an increase in alanine transaminase and an increase of aspartate aminotransferase, which can be signs of liver damage, headache, nausea, abdominal pain, fatigue, diarrhea and musculoskeletal pain.

Omaveloxolone was approved for medical use in the United States in February 2023, and in the European Union in February 2024. The US Food and Drug Administration (FDA) considers it to be a first-in-class medication.

== Medical uses ==
Omaveloxolone is indicated for the treatment of Friedreich's ataxia.

Friedreich's ataxia causes progressive damage to the spinal cord, peripheral nerves, and the brain, resulting in uncoordinated muscle movement, poor balance, difficulty walking, changes in speech and swallowing, and a shortened lifespan. The condition can also cause heart disease. This disease tends to develop in children and teenagers and gradually worsens over time.

Although rare, Friedreich's ataxia is the most common form of hereditary ataxia in the United States, affecting about one in every 50,000 people.

== Mechanism of action ==
The mechanism of action of omaveloxolone and its related compounds has been demonstrated to be through a combination of activation of the antioxidative transcription factor Nrf2 and inhibition of the pro-inflammatory transcription factor NF-κB.

Nrf2 transcriptionally regulates multiple genes that play both direct and indirect roles in producing antioxidative potential and the production of cellular energy (i.e., adenosine triphosphate or ATP) within the mitochondria. Consequently, unlike exogenously administered antioxidants (e.g., vitamin E or coenzyme Q_{10}), which provide a specific and finite antioxidative potential, omaveloxolone, through Nrf2, broadly activates intracellular and mitochondrial antioxidative pathways, in addition to pathways that may directly increase mitochondrial biogenesis (such as PGC1α) and bioenergetics.

== History ==
Omaveloxolone is a second generation member of the synthetic oleanane triterpenoid compounds and in clinical development by Reata Pharmaceuticals. Preclinical studies have demonstrated that omaveloxolone possesses antioxidative and anti-inflammatory activities and the ability to improve mitochondrial bioenergetics. Omaveloxolone is under clinical investigation for a variety of indications, including Friedreich's ataxia, mitochondrial myopathies, immunooncology, and prevention of corneal endothelial cell loss following cataract surgery.

The efficacy and safety of omaveloxolone was evaluated in a 48-week randomized, placebo-controlled, and double-blind study [Study 1 (NCT02255435)] and an open-label extension. Study 1 enrolled 103 individuals with Friedreich's ataxia who received placebo (52 individuals) or omaveloxolone 150 mg (51 individuals) for 48 weeks. Of the research participants, 53% were male, 97% were white, and the mean age was 24 years at study entry. Nine (18%) patients were younger than age 18. The primary objective was to evaluate the change in the modified Friedreich's Ataxia Rating Scale (mFARS) score compared to placebo at week 48. The mFARS is a clinical assessment that measures disease progression, namely swallowing and speech (bulbar), upper limb coordination, lower limb coordination, and upright stability. Individuals receiving omaveloxolone performed better on the mFARS than people receiving placebo.

The US Food and Drug Administration (FDA) granted the application for omaveloxolone orphan drug, fast track, priority review, and rare pediatric disease designations.

== Society and culture ==
=== Legal status ===
Omaveloxolone was approved for medical use in the United States in February 2023.

In December 2023, the Committee for Medicinal Products for Human Use (CHMP) of the European Medicines Agency adopted a positive opinion, recommending the granting of a marketing authorization for the medicinal product Skyclarys, intended for the treatment of Friedreich's ataxia. The applicant for this medicinal product is Reata Ireland Limited. Omaveloxolone was approved for medical use in the European Union in February 2024.
