= Friedreich's ataxia =

Rare autosomal-recessive human disease

- Other names: FRDA, FA, Autosomal recessive cerebellar ataxia (ARCA)
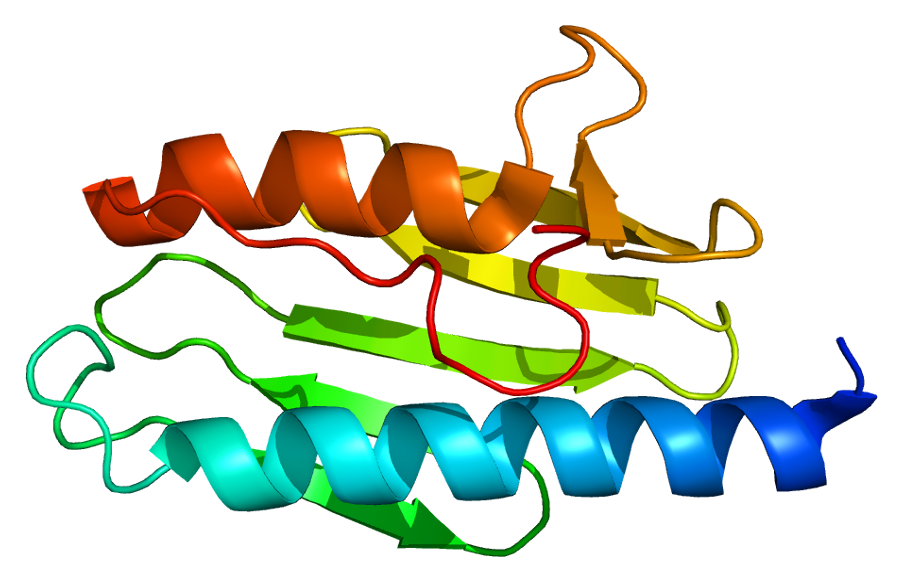
- Frataxin
- Pronunciation: /ˈfriːdraɪks əˈtæksiə/.
- Specialty: Neurology, Genetics
- Symptoms: Muscle weakness, ataxia, fatigue, speech difficulties, scoliosis, heart disease, diabetes
- Complications: Involuntary nystagmus, cardiomyopathy, scoliosis, diabetes
- Usual onset: Childhood or adolescence
- Duration: Long-term
- Causes: Mutation in FXN gene
- Risk factors: Family history (autosomal recessive inheritance)
- Diagnostic method: Clinical evaluation, genetic testing, MRI, electromyography
- Treatment: Symptom management, physical therapy,
- Medication: Omaveloxolone
- Prognosis: Progressive; reduced life expectancy
- Frequency: 1 in 50,000 (United States)
- Deaths: Often due to cardiac complications

Friedreich's ataxia (FRDA) is a rare, inherited, autosomal recessive neurodegenerative disorder that primarily affects the nervous system, causing progressive damage to the spinal cord, peripheral nerves, and cerebellum, leading to impaired muscle coordination (ataxia). The condition typically manifests in childhood or adolescence, with initial symptoms including difficulty walking, loss of balance, and poor coordination. As the disease progresses, it can also impact speech, vision, and hearing. Many individuals with Friedreich's ataxia develop scoliosis, diabetes, and hypertrophic cardiomyopathy, a serious heart condition that is a leading cause of mortality in patients.

Friedreich's ataxia is caused by mutations in the FXN gene, which result in reduced production of frataxin, a protein essential for mitochondrial function, particularly in iron-sulfur cluster biogenesis. The deficiency of frataxin disrupts cellular energy production and leads to oxidative stress, contributing to the neurological and systemic symptoms associated with the disorder. Degeneration of nerve tissue in the spinal cord causes the ataxia; particularly affected are the sensory neurons essential for directing muscle movement of the arms and legs through connections with the cerebellum. The spinal cord becomes thinner, and nerve cells lose some myelin sheath.

There is currently no cure for Friedreich's ataxia, but treatment focuses on symptom management and slowing disease progression. In 2023, the US Food and Drug Administration (FDA) approved omaveloxolone as the first treatment for Friedreich's ataxia. This medication works by reducing oxidative stress and inflammation in neurons, which helps improve motor function in some patients. Ongoing research continues to explore potential therapies aimed at increasing frataxin levels, protecting mitochondria, and addressing the genetic cause of the disease. Although life expectancy may be reduced, particularly due to cardiac complications, advancements in care and treatment have improved outcomes for many individuals with Friedreich's ataxia.

FRDA is the most common inherited ataxia (1 in 40,000 of those of European descent). Rates of FRDA are highest in people of Western European descent; it is comparatively rare in other ethnic groups. The condition is named after German physician Nikolaus Friedreich, who first described it in the 1860s.

== Signs and symptoms ==
Symptoms typically start between the ages of 5 and 15, but in late-onset FRDA, they may occur after the age of 25 years. The symptoms are broad, but consistently involve gait and limb ataxia, dysarthria and loss of lower limb reflexes.

=== Classical symptoms ===
There is some variability in symptom frequency, onset and progression. All individuals with FRDA develop neurological symptoms, including dysarthria and loss of lower limb reflexes, and more than 90% present with ataxia. Cardiac issues are very common with early onset FRDA . Most individuals develop heart problems such as enlargement of the heart, symmetrical hypertrophy, heart murmurs, atrial fibrillation, tachycardia, hypertrophic cardiomyopathy, and conduction defects. Scoliosis is present in about 60%. 7% of people with FRDA also have diabetes, and having diabetes is associated with poorer outcomes in FA, especially those who show symptoms when young.

=== Other symptoms ===
People who have been living with FRDA for a long time may develop other complications. 36.8% experience decreased visual acuity, which may be progressive and could lead to functional blindness. Hearing loss is present in about 10.9% of cases. Some patients report bladder and bowel symptoms. Advanced stages of disease are associated with supraventricular tachyarrhythmias, most commonly atrial fibrillation.

Other later stage symptoms can include, cerebellar effects such as nystagmus, fast saccadic eye movements, dysmetria and loss of coordination (truncal ataxia, and stomping gait). Symptoms can involve the dorsal column, such as the loss of vibratory sensation and proprioceptive sensation.

The progressive loss of coordination and muscle strength leads to the full-time use of a wheelchair. Most young people diagnosed with FRDA require mobility aids such as a cane, walker, or wheelchair by the early 20s. The disease is progressive, with increasing staggering or stumbling gait and frequent falling. By the third decade, affected people lose the ability to stand or walk without assistance and require a wheelchair for mobility.

=== Early-onset cases ===
Non-neurological symptoms such as scoliosis, pes cavus, cardiomyopathy and diabetes are more frequent among the early-onset cases.

== Genetics ==
FRDA has an autosomal-recessive pattern of inheritance.

FRDA is an autosomal-recessive disorder that affects a gene (FXN) on chromosome 9, which produces an important protein called frataxin.

In 96% of cases, the mutant FXN gene has 90–1,300 GAA trinucleotide repeat expansions in intron 1 of both alleles. This expansion causes epigenetic changes and formation of heterochromatin near the repeat. The length of the shorter GAA repeat is correlated with the age of onset and disease severity. The formation of heterochromatin results in reduced transcription of the gene and low levels of frataxin. People with FDRA might have 5–35% of the frataxin protein compared to healthy individuals. Heterozygous carriers of the mutant FXN gene have 50% lower frataxin levels, but this decrease is not enough to cause symptoms.

In about 4% of cases, the disease is caused by a (missense, nonsense, or intronic) point mutation, with an expansion in one allele and a point mutation in the other. A missense point mutation can have milder symptoms. Depending on the point mutation, cells can produce no frataxin, nonfunctional frataxin, or frataxin that is not properly localized to the mitochondria.

== Pathophysiology ==
FRDA affects the nervous system, heart, pancreas, and other systems.

Degeneration of nerve tissue in the spinal cord causes ataxia. The sensory neurons essential for directing muscle movement of the arms and legs through connections with the cerebellum are particularly affected. The disease primarily affects the spinal cord and peripheral nerves.

The spinal cord becomes thinner, and nerve cells lose some myelin sheath. The diameter of the spinal cord is smaller than that of unaffected individuals, mainly due to smaller dorsal root ganglia. The motor neurons of the spinal cord are affected to a lesser extent than sensory neurons. In peripheral nerves, a loss of large myelinated sensory fibers occurs.

Structures in the brain are also affected by FRDA, notably the dentate nucleus of the cerebellum. The heart often develops some fibrosis, and over time, develops left-ventricle hypertrophy and dilatation of the left ventricle.

=== Frataxin ===
The exact role of frataxin remains unclear. Frataxin assists iron-sulfur protein synthesis in the electron transport chain to generate adenosine triphosphate, the energy molecule necessary to carry out metabolic functions in cells. It also regulates iron transfer in the mitochondria by providing a proper amount of reactive oxygen species (ROS) to maintain normal processes. One result of frataxin deficiency is mitochondrial iron overload, which damages many proteins due to effects on cellular metabolism.

Without frataxin, the energy in the mitochondria falls, and excess iron creates extra ROS, leading to further cell damage. Low frataxin levels lead to insufficient biosynthesis of iron–sulfur clusters that are required for mitochondrial electron transport and assembly of functional aconitase and iron dysmetabolism of the entire cell.

== Diagnosis ==
Balance difficulty, loss of proprioception, an absence of reflexes, and signs of other neurological problems are common signs from a physical examination. Diagnostic tests are made to confirm a physical examination such as electromyogram, nerve conduction studies, electrocardiogram, echocardiogram, blood tests for elevated glucose levels and vitamin E levels, and scans such as X-ray radiograph for scoliosis. MRI and CT scans of brain and spinal cord are done to rule out other neurological conditions. Finally, a genetic test is conducted to confirm.

Other diagnoses might include Charcot–Marie–Tooth types 1 and 2, ataxia with vitamin E deficiency, ataxia-oculomotor apraxia types 1 and 2, and other early-onset ataxias.

== Management ==
Physicians and patients can reference the clinical management guidelines for Friedreich ataxia. These guidelines are intended to assist qualified healthcare professionals in making informed treatment decisions about the care of individuals with Friedreich ataxia.

=== Therapeutics ===
==== Omaveloxolone ====
Omaveloxolone, sold under the brand name Skyclarys, is a medication used for the treatment of Friedreich's ataxia. It is taken by mouth.

The most common side effects include an increase in alanine transaminase and an increase of aspartate aminotransferase, which can be signs of liver damage, headache, nausea, abdominal pain, fatigue, diarrhea and musculoskeletal pain.

Omaveloxolone was approved for medical use in the United States in February 2023, and in the European Union in February 2024. The US Food and Drug Administration (FDA) considers it to be a first-in-class medication.

=== Rehabilitation ===
Physical therapists play a critical role in educating on correct posture, muscle use, and the identification and avoidance of features that aggravate spasticities such as tight clothing, poorly adjusted wheelchairs, pain, and infection.

Physical therapy typically includes intensive motor coordination, balance, and stabilization training to preserve gains. Low-intensity strengthening exercises are incorporated to maintain functional use of the upper and lower extremities. Stretching and muscle relaxation exercises can be prescribed to help manage spasticity and prevent deformities. Other physical therapy goals include increased transfer and locomotion independence, muscle strengthening, increased physical resilience, "safe fall" strategy, learning to use mobility aids, learning how to reduce the body's energy expenditure, and developing specific breathing patterns. Speech therapy can improve voice quality.

=== Devices ===
Well-fitted orthoses can promote correct posture, support normal joint alignment, stabilize joints during walking, improve range of motion and gait, reduce spasticity, and prevent foot deformities and scoliosis.

Functional electrical stimulation or transcutaneous nerve stimulation devices may alleviate symptoms.

As progression of ataxia continues, assistive devices such as a cane, walker, or wheelchair may be required for mobility and independence. A standing frame can help reduce the secondary complications of prolonged use of a wheelchair.

=== Managing cardiac involvement ===
Cardiac abnormalities can be controlled with ACE inhibitors such as enalapril, ramipril, lisinopril, or trandolapril, sometimes used in conjunction with beta blockers. Affected people who also have symptomatic congestive heart failure may be prescribed eplerenone or digoxin to keep cardiac abnormalities under control.

=== Surgical intervention ===
Surgery may correct deformities caused by abnormal muscle tone. Titanium screws and rods inserted in the spine help prevent or slow the progression of scoliosis. Surgery to lengthen the Achilles tendon can improve independence and mobility to alleviate equinus deformity. An automated implantable cardioverter-defibrillator can be implanted after a severe heart failure.

== Prognosis ==
The disease evolves differently in different people. In general, those diagnosed at a younger age or with longer GAA triplet expansions tend to have more severe symptoms.

Congestive heart failure and abnormal heart rhythms are the leading causes of death, but people with fewer symptoms can live into their 60s or older.

== Epidemiology ==
FRDA affects Indo-European populations. It is rare in East Asians, sub-Saharan Africans, and Native Americans. FRDA is the most prevalent inherited ataxia, affecting approximately 1 in 40,000 with European descent. Males and females are affected equally. The estimated carrier prevalence is 1:100. A 1990–1996 study of Europeans calculated the incidence rate was 2.8:100,000. The prevalence rate of FRDA in Japan is 1:1,000,000.

FRDA follows the same pattern as haplogroup R1b. Haplogroup R1b is the most frequently occurring paternal lineage in Western Europe. FRDA and Haplogroup R1b are more common in northern Spain, Ireland, and France, rare in Russia and Scandinavia, and follow a gradient through central and eastern Europe. A population carrying the disease went through a population bottleneck in the Franco-Cantabrian region during the last ice age.

== History ==
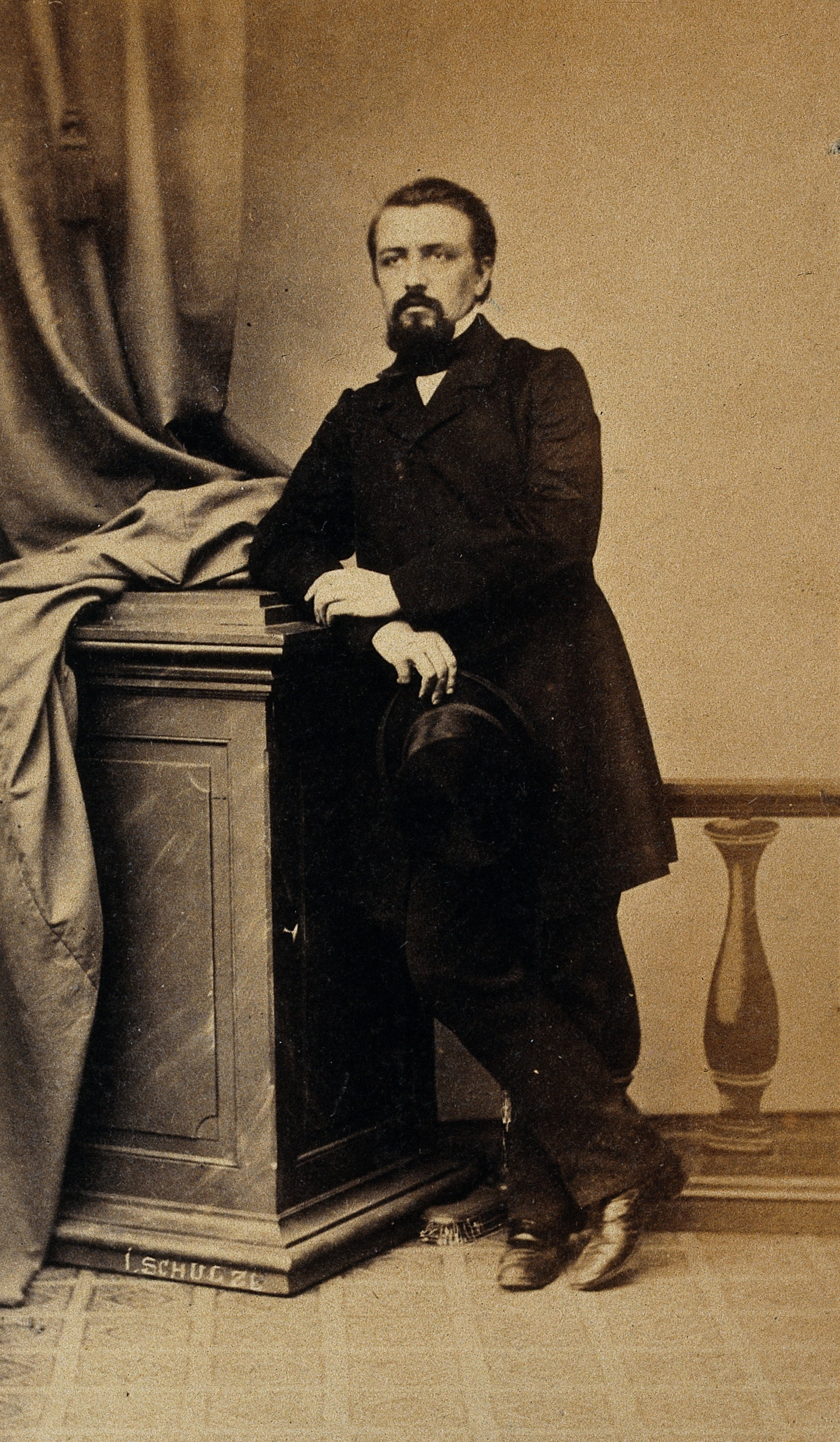
Nikolaus Friedreich

The condition is named after the nineteenth century German pathologist and neurologist, Nikolaus Friedreich. Friedreich reported the disease in 1863 at the University of Heidelberg. Further observations appeared in a paper in 1876.

Frantz Fanon wrote his medical thesis on FRDA, in 1951.

A 1984 Canadian study traced 40 cases to one common ancestral couple arriving in New France in 1634.

FRDA was first linked to a GAA repeat expansion on chromosome 9 in 1996.

== Society and culture ==
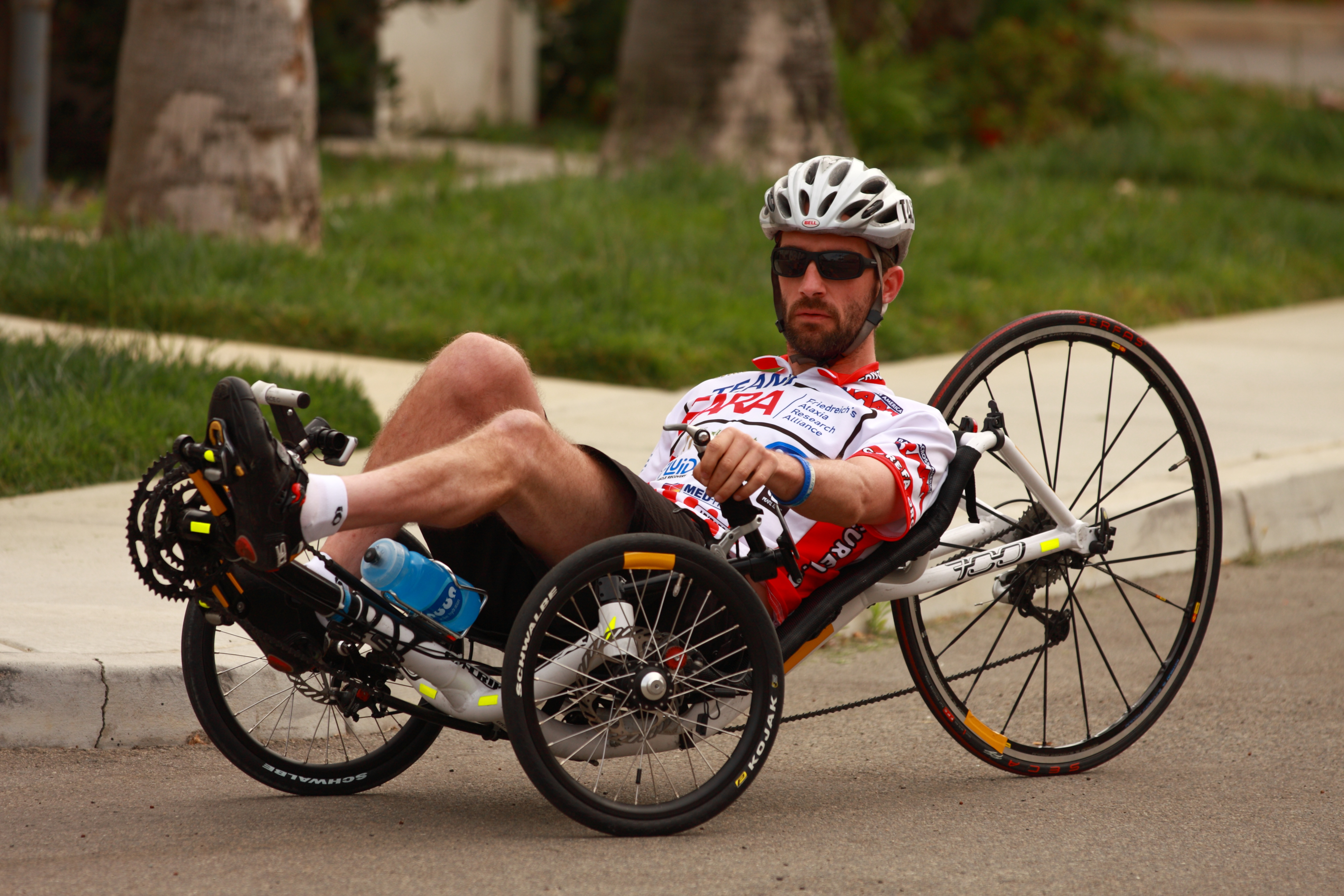
Kyle Bryant training on his recumbent bicycle

The Cake Eaters is a 2007 independent drama film that stars Kristen Stewart as a young woman with FRDA.

The Ataxian is a documentary that tells the story of Kyle Bryant, an athlete with FRDA who completes a long-distance bike race in an adaptive "trike" to raise money for research.

Dynah Haubert, who has FRDA, spoke at the 2016 Democratic National Convention about supporting Americans with disabilities.

Geraint Williams is an athlete affected by FRDA who is known for scaling Mount Kilimanjaro in an adaptive wheelchair.

Shobhika Kalra is an activist with FRDA who helped build over 1000 wheelchair ramps across the United Arab Emirates in 2018 to try to make Dubai fully wheelchair-friendly by 2020.

Butterflies Still Fly is a 2023 film, based on a true story, directed by Joseph Nenci. Italo is a light-hearted journalist, darkened by a personal drama that distracts him from work. He encounters Giorgia, a young woman with Friedreich's ataxia, who will change his life.

Comedians Fiona Cauley and Lane Glaze have Friedrich's ataxia and often talk about their disability and wheelchairs in their comedy.

== Research ==
There is no cure for Friedreich's ataxia, and treatment development is directed toward slowing, stopping, or reversing disease progression. In 2023, omaveloxolone became the first drug approved for Friedreich's ataxia and, as of 2026, remains the only approved disease-modifying therapy. Numerous other candidates remain in clinical and preclinical development.

Patients can enroll in a registry to make clinical trial recruiting easier. The Friedreich's Ataxia Global Patient Registry is the only worldwide registry of Friedreich's ataxia patients to characterize the symptoms and establish the rate of disease progression. The Friedreich's Ataxia App is the only global community app which enables novel forms of research.

The Friedreich's Ataxia Research Alliance (FARA) is a patient advocacy and research organization that coordinates the FA community, funds research, and maintains a pipeline describing the drug development programs underway. FARA established the Collaborative Clinical Research Network in Friedreich's ataxia in 2004 to develop clinical endpoints, and funds the Friedreich Ataxia Clinical Outcome Measures Study (FACOMS), a natural history study whose data have been used to develop disease rating scales and to provide comparator cohorts for clinical trials.

The main candidates in clinical development are summarized below; each approach is described in the sections that follow, which also cover earlier-stage and preclinical work.

Selected Friedreich's ataxia therapeutic candidates (as of 2026)
Candidate	Approach	Developer	Stage
Omaveloxolone	Mitochondrial / oxidative stress	Biogen	Approved (2023)
Vatiquinone	Mitochondrial / oxidative stress	PTC Therapeutics	Filed; complete response letter (2026)
Nomlabofusp	Frataxin replacement	Larimar Therapeutics	Phase 2; BLA filing (2026)
DT-216P2	Increase gene expression	Design Therapeutics	Phase 1/2
LX2006	Gene addition	Lexeo Therapeutics	Phase 1/2
SGT-212	Gene addition	Solid Biosciences	Phase 1b
CAP-004	Gene addition	Capsida Biotherapeutics	Preclinical
PPL-001	Ex vivo cell therapy	Papillon Therapeutics	Preclinical

=== Improve mitochondrial function and reduce oxidative stress ===
- Vatiquinone (also known as PTC-743 or EPI-743) is being developed by PTC Therapeutics. It is a para-benzoquinone that targets the NAD(P)H dehydrogenase (quinone 1) (NQO1) enzyme to increase the biosynthesis of glutathione. In the placebo-controlled MOVE-FA trial, vatiquinone did not meet its primary endpoint of change in mFARS, although a prespecified subscale analysis was positive; in 2026 the Food and Drug Administration (FDA) issued a complete response letter requesting additional evidence of efficacy.

=== Modulation of frataxin-controlled metabolic pathways ===
- Dimethyl fumarate has been shown to increase frataxin levels in FRDA cells, mouse models, and humans.

=== Frataxin replacement, stabilizers, or enhancers ===
- Nomlabofusp (CTI-1601) is a recombinant fusion protein designed to deliver frataxin to mitochondria. It is being developed by Larimar Therapeutics, which began a rolling submission of a Biologics License Application to the FDA in 2026 seeking accelerated approval.

=== Increase frataxin gene expression ===
- DT-216P2 is a small molecule (a "GeneTAC", derived from synthetic transcription elongation factors) that increases frataxin expression by binding the expanded GAA repeat in the first intron of the FXN gene and recruiting the transcription elongation machinery to restore expression of the silenced gene. It is being developed by Design Therapeutics; the first-generation molecule DT-216 was discontinued because of injection-site tolerability, and the second-generation DT-216P2 entered a Phase 1/2 trial (RESTORE-FA) in 2025.
- Nicotinamide (vitamin B_{3}) was found effective in preclinical FRDA models and well tolerated.

=== Gene addition ===
Several gene-addition approaches use adeno-associated virus (AAV) vectors to deliver a functional FXN gene.

- LX2006 (Lexeo Therapeutics, with Weill Cornell Medicine) is an intravenously administered AAV gene therapy developed for FA-associated cardiomyopathy.
- SGT-212 (Solid Biosciences) is an AAV gene therapy delivering full-length FXN through a dual route—a stereotactic, MRI-guided intradentate-nucleus infusion followed by intravenous infusion—to target neurologic and cardiac disease. Its first-in-human Phase 1b trial (FALCON) dosed its first participant in 2026.
- CAP-004 (Capsida Biotherapeutics) is a systemically administered gene therapy using an engineered capsid to target the central nervous system, heart, and sensory tissues; it is in preclinical and IND-enabling development.
- Earlier preclinical work showed that lentivirus-mediated delivery of the FXN gene increased frataxin expression and prevented DNA damage in human and mouse fibroblasts.

=== Ex vivo cell therapy ===
- PPL-001 (Papillon Therapeutics) is an ex vivo gene-edited cell therapy in preclinical development.

=== Gene editing ===
- CRISPR Therapeutics received a grant from FARA to investigate gene editing as a potential treatment for the disease in 2017.

FARA's pipeline also lists additional programs in earlier development, including elamipretide (Stealth Biotherapeutics) and a study combining nicotinamide riboside with exercise, both targeting mitochondrial function, and an AAV gene therapy program from Neurocrine Biosciences and Voyager Therapeutics.
