= Chemotherapy-induced nausea and vomiting =

Common side effects in chemotherapy treatment

Chemotherapy-induced nausea and vomiting (CINV) is a common side-effect of many cancer treatments. Nausea and vomiting are two of the most feared cancer treatment-related side effects for cancer patients and their families. In 1983, Coates et al. found that patients receiving chemotherapy ranked nausea and vomiting as the first and second most severe side effects, respectively. Up to 20% of patients receiving highly emetogenic agents in this era postponed, or even refused, potentially curative treatments. Since the 1990s, several novel classes of antiemetics have been developed and commercialized, becoming a nearly universal standard in chemotherapy regimens, and helping to better manage these symptoms in a large portion of patients. Efficient mediation of these unpleasant and sometimes debilitating symptoms results in increased quality of life for the patient, and better overall health of the patient, and, due to better patient tolerance, more effective treatment cycles.

== Types ==
There are several subtypes of CINV. The classifications of nausea and vomiting are:

- Acute: occurring within 24 hours of chemotherapy
- Delayed: occurring between 24 hours and 5 days after treatment
- Breakthrough: occurring despite prophylactic treatment
- Anticipatory: triggered by taste, odor, memories, visions, or anxiety related to chemotherapy
- Refractory: occurring during subsequent cycles when antiemetics have failed in earlier cycles

== Cause ==
Vomiting is a defense mechanism controlled by the area postrema of the medulla oblongata. There are various sources of input to the vomiting center. Receptors on the floor of the fourth ventricle of the brain represent the chemoreceptor trigger zone. The chemoreceptor trigger zone contains dopamine D2 receptors, serotonin 5-HT_{3} receptors, opioid receptors, acetylcholine receptors, and receptors for substance P. Stimulation of different receptors are involved in different pathways leading to emesis. In the final common pathway, substance P, which activates the neurokinin-1 receptor, appears to be involved. Additionally, the vagal and enteric nervous system inputs transmit information regarding the state of the gastrointestinal system.

Chemotherapy interferes with cell division, which particularly affects rapidly dividing cells like those of the gastrointestinal mucosa and immune cells. Irritation of the GI mucosa by chemotherapy, radiation, distention, or acute infectious gastroenteritis activates the 5-HT_{3} receptors of these inputs. It is now widely known that cytotoxic chemotherapeutic agents cause enterochromaffin cells to produce more serotonin in response to free radical damage, leading to a detectable increase in blood levels of serotonin (5-HT) and its major metabolite, 5-Hydroxyindoleacetic acid (5-HIAA). The presence of these chemicals in the blood activate 5-HT_{3} receptors in the chemoreceptor trigger zone, in turn releasing substance P, which activates NK_{1} receptors to cause an emetic response (vomiting).

== Risk factors ==
The risk of chemotherapy-induced nausea and vomiting varies based on the type of treatment received as well as several outside factors. Some types of chemotherapy are more prone to causing nausea and vomiting than others. Some chemotherapeutic agents may not cause nausea and vomiting on their own, but may when used in combination with other agents. Regimens that are linked to a high incidence (90% or higher) of nausea and vomiting are referred to as "highly emetogenic chemotherapy", and those causing a moderate incidence (30–90%) of nausea and vomiting are referred to as "moderately emetogenic chemotherapy".

Some highly emetogenic agents and chemotherapy regimens include:

- ABVD
- AC
- BEP
- Cisplatin
- Carmustine (>250 mg/m^{2})
- CBV
- Cyclophosphamide (>1500 mg/m^{2})
- Dacarbazine
- Mechlorethamine
- MOPP/COPP/BEACOPP
- Streptozocin
- VIP

Some moderately emetogenic agents and regimens include:

- Carboplatin
- CHOP/CHOP-R
- Cyclophosphamide (≤1500 mg/m^{2})
- Docetaxel
- Doxorubicin/Adriamycin
- Etoposide
- Ifosfamide
- Methotrexate
- Paclitaxel

Besides the type of treatment, personal factors may put a patient at greater risk for CINV. Other risk factors include:

- Anticipation of CINV
- Anxiety or depression
- Female sex
- History of light alcohol use
- History of motion sickness
- History of nausea and vomiting during pregnancy
- History of previous CINV
- Patient age (under 55 years old)

== Treatments ==
Several treatment methods are available to help prevent CINV. Pharmaceutical treatment is generally separated into two types: prophylactic (preventative) treatment, given before the dose of chemotherapy agents, and rescue treatment, given to treat breakthrough nausea and vomiting.

=== 5-HT_{3} inhibitors ===
5-HT_{3} receptor antagonists are very effective antiemetics and constitute a great advance in the management of CINV. These drugs block one or more of the nerve signals that cause nausea and vomiting. During the first 24 hours after chemotherapy, the most effective approach appears to be blocking the 5-HT_{3} nerve signal. Approved 5-HT_{3} inhibitors include dolasetron (Anzemet), granisetron (Kytril, Sancuso), and ondansetron (Zofran). Their antiemetic effect due to blockade of 5HT3 receptor on vagal afferent in the gut. in addition they also block 5-HT3 receptors in CTZ and STN. The newest 5-HT_{3} inhibitor, palonosetron (Aloxi), also prevents delayed nausea and vomiting, which can occur during the 2–5 days after treatment. Since some patients have trouble swallowing pills, these drugs are often available by injection, as orally disintegrating tablets, or as transdermal patches.

=== NK_{1} inhibitors ===
A newer class of drugs known as the NK_{1} antagonists are a recently developed class of very efficacious drugs for controlling CINV. These drugs are often used alongside 5HT_{3} inhibitors and corticosteroids to form a very potent cocktail of antiemetics that verge on achieving a nearly complete patient response (that is, completely stopping CINV). The substance P inhibitor aprepitant (Emend), which became available in 2005, is highly effective in controlling nausea and vomiting associated with cancer chemotherapy. Aprepitant has been shown to inhibit both the acute and delayed emesis induced by cytotoxic chemotherapeutic drugs by blocking substance P landing on receptors in the brains neurons. Indeed, positron emission tomography (PET) studies have shown that aprepitant can penetrate the brain and NK_{1} receptors in the brain. Aprepitant has also been shown to increase the activity of the 5-HT_{3} receptor antagonists ondansetron and the corticosteroid dexamethasone, which are also used to prevent nausea and vomiting caused by chemotherapy. Netupitant has recently been approved by USFDA. It has also been marketed in combination with palonosetron. Rolapitant is the newest addition in the approved NK1 antagonist list. It has advantage of a very long half-life: duration of action is around 150 hours. Rolapitant got its approval by USFDA in 2015.

=== Other drugs ===
Olanzapine, as well as several other neuroleptic drugs, have also has been investigated for the control of CINV. A 2007 study demonstrated Olanzapine's successful potential for this use, achieving a complete response in the acute prevention of nausea and vomiting in 100% of patients treated with moderately and highly emetogenic chemotherapy, when used in combination with palonosetron and dexamethasone. Neuroleptic agents are now indicated for rescue treatment and the control of breakthrough nausea and vomiting.

Some studies and patient groups say that the use of cannabinoids derived from cannabis during chemotherapy greatly reduces the associated nausea and vomiting, and enables the patient to eat. Synthesized tetrahydrocannabinol (also one of the main active substances in marijuana) is marketed as Marinol and may be practical for this application. Natural medical cannabis is also used and recommended by some oncologists, though its use is regulated and it is not legal in all jurisdictions. However, Marinol was less effective than megestrol acetate in helping cancer patients regain lost appetites. A phase III study found no difference in effects of an oral cannabis extract or THC on appetite and quality of life (QOL) in patients with cancer-related anorexia-cachexia syndrome (CACS) to placebo.

Dexamethasone, a corticosteroid, is often used alongside other antiemetic drugs, as it has synergistic action with many of them, although its specific antiemetic mechanism of action is not fully understood. Metoclopramide, a dopamine D_{2} receptor antagonist with possible other mechanisms, is an older drug that is sometimes used, either on its own or in combination with others. Histamine blockers such as diphenhydramine or meclozine may be used in rescue treatment. Lorazepam and diazepam may sometimes be used to relieve anxiety associated with CINV before administration of chemotherapy, and are also often used in the case of rescue treatment.

=== Alternative treatments ===
==== Ginger (Zingiber officinale) ====
There are several compounds that have been identified within ginger that have been shown to possess properties that are likely to be beneficial in the treatment of CINV. This includes 5-HT3 and substance P antagonism, modulation of gastrointestinal motility, and antioxidant properties. There have been multiple clinical trials that have investigated the use of ginger supplementation as a treatment for CINV. However, due to conflicting results and methodological issues, a 2013 systematic review of seven clinical trials summarized the current evidence as stating that "Despite the widespread use of ginger in the treatment of nausea in other contexts such as gestational nausea, the current literature provides mixed support for the use of ginger as a standard part of anti-CINV control for patients undergoing chemotherapy."

==== Other ====
Non-pharmacological approaches to remedy CINV typically involve small lifestyle alterations, such as using unscented deodorants and soaps, avoiding strong scents altogether, and dietary modifications such as eating several small meals throughout the day, eating high-protein, high-calorie food, drinking many clear liquids, and removing spicy, fatty, fried, or acidic foods from the diet. Patients may also participate in alternative practices such as self-hypnosis, relaxation and imagery therapy, distraction, music therapy, biofeedback, desensitization, or acupressure.

== See also ==
- Cancer and nausea
