= Cancer and nausea =

Medical symptom

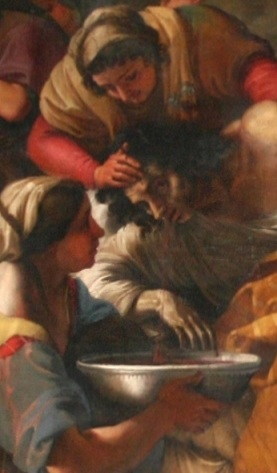
A painting from 1681 depicting a person affected by nausea and vomiting

Cancer and nausea are associated, with about fifty percent of people affected by cancer experiencing nausea. This may be as a result of the cancer itself, or as an effect of the treatment such as chemotherapy, radiation therapy, or other medication such as opiates used for pain relief. About 70–80% of people undergoing chemotherapy experience nausea or vomiting. Nausea and vomiting may also occur in people not receiving treatment, often as a result of the disease involving the gastrointestinal tract, electrolyte imbalance, or as a result of anxiety. Nausea and vomiting may be experienced as the most unpleasant side effects of cytotoxic drugs and may result in patients delaying or refusing further radiotherapy or chemotherapy.

The strategies of management or therapy of nausea and vomiting depend on the underlying causes. Medical treatments or conditions associated with a high risk of nausea and/or vomiting include chemotherapy, radiotherapy, and malignant bowel obstruction. Anticipatory nausea and vomiting may also occur. Nausea and vomiting may lead to further medical conditions and complications including: dehydration, electrolyte imbalance, malnutrition, and a decrease in quality of life.

Nausea may be defined as an unpleasant sensation of the need to vomit. It may be accompanied by symptoms such as salivation, feeling faint, and a fast heart rate. Vomiting is the forceful ejection of stomach contents through the mouth. Although nausea and vomiting are closely related, some patients experience one symptom without the other and it may be easier to eliminate vomiting than nausea. The vomiting reflex (also called emesis) is thought to have evolved in many animal species as a protective mechanism against ingested toxins. In humans, the vomiting response may be preceded by an unpleasant sensation termed nausea, but nausea may also occur without vomiting. The central nervous system is the primary site where a number of emetic stimuli (input) are received, processed and efferent signals (output) are generated as a response and sent to various effector organs or tissues, leading to processes that eventually end in vomiting. The detection of emetic stimuli, the central processing by the brain and the resulting response by organs and tissues that lead to nausea and vomiting are referred to as the emetic pathway or emetic arch.

== Causes ==
Some medical conditions that arise as a result of cancer or as a complication of its treatment are known to be associated with a high risk of nausea and/or vomiting. These include malignant bowel obstruction (MBO), chemotherapy-induced nausea and vomiting (CINV), anticipatory nausea and vomiting (ANV),and radiotherapy-induced nausea and vomiting (RINV).

=== Malignant bowel obstruction ===
Malignant bowel obstruction (MBO) of the gastrointestinal tract is a common complication of advanced cancer, especially in patients with bowel or gynaecological cancer. These include colorectal cancer, ovarian cancer, breast cancer, and melanoma. Three percent of all advanced cancers lead to malignant bowel obstruction, and 25 to 50 percent of patients with ovarian cancer experience at least one episode of malignant bowel obstruction. The mechanisms of action that may lead to nausea in MBO include mechanical compression of the gut, motility disorders, gastrointestinal secretion accumulation, decreased gastrointestinal absorption, and inflammation. Bowel obstruction and the resulting nausea may also occur as a result of anti-cancer therapy such as radiation, or adhesion after surgery. Impaired gastric emptying as a result of bowel obstruction may not respond to drugs alone, and surgical intervention is sometimes the only means of symptom relief. Some constipating drugs used in cancer therapy such as opioids may cause a slowing of peristalsis of the gut, which may lead to a functional bowel obstruction.

=== Chemotherapy ===
Chemotherapy-induced nausea and vomiting (CINV) is one of the most feared side effects of chemotherapy and is associated with a significant deterioration in quality of life. CINV is classified into three categories:

- early onset (occurring within 24 hours of initial exposure to chemotherapy)
- delayed onset (occurring 24 hours to several days after treatment)
- anticipatory (triggered by taste, odor, sight, thoughts, or anxiety)

Risk factors that predict the occurrence and severity of CINV include sex and age, with females, younger people and people who have a high pretreatment expectation of nausea being at a higher risk, while people with a history of high alcohol consumption being at a lower risk. Other person-related variables, such as chemotherapy dose, rate and route of administration, hydration status, prior history of CINV, emesis during pregnancy or motion sickness, tumour burden, concomitant medication and medical conditions also play a role in the degree of CINV experienced by a person. By far the most important factor which determines the degree of CINV is the emetogenic potential of the chemotherapeutic agents used. Chemotherapeutic agents are classified into four groups according to their degree of emetogenicity: high, moderate, low and minimal.

Chemotherapeutic agents associated with vomiting
Association with vomiting	Examples
Highly emetogenic (>90%) Intravenous agents	Cisplatin, Mechlorethamine, Streptozotocin, Cyclophosphamide > 1500 mg/m^{2}, Carmustine, Dacarbazine, Anthracycline
Highly emetogenic (>90%) oral agents	Hexamethylmelamine, Procarbazine
Moderately emetogenic (30–90%) intravenous agents	Oxaliplatin, Cytarabine > 1g/m^{2}, Carboplatin, Ifosfamide, Cyclophosphamide < 1500 mg/m^{2}, Doxorubicin, Daunorubicin, Epirubicin, Idarubicin, Irinotecan, Azacitidine, Bendamustine, Clofarabine, Alemtuzumab
Moderately emetogenic (30–90%) oral agents	Cyclophosphamide, Temozolomide, Vinorelbine, Imatinib

The European Society of Medical Oncology (ESMO) and the Multinational Association of Supportive Care in Cancer (MASCC) in 2010 as well as the American Society of Clinical Oncology (ASCO) (2011) recommend a prophylaxis to prevent acute vomiting and nausea following chemotherapy with high emetic risk drugs by using a three-drug regimen including a 5-HT3 receptor antagonist, dexamethasone and aprepitant (a neurokinin-1 antagonist) given before chemotherapy.

=== Anticipatory ===
A common consequence of cancer treatment is the development of anticipatory nausea and vomiting (ANV). This kind of nausea is usually elicited by the re-exposure of the patients to the clinical context they need to attend to be treated. Approximately 20% of people undergoing chemotherapy are reported to develop anticipatory nausea and vomiting. Once developed, ANV is difficult to control by pharmacological means. Benzodiazepines are the only drugs that have been found to reduce the occurrence of ANV but their efficacy decreases with time. Recently, clinical trials suggests that cannabidiolic acid suppresses conditioned gaping (ANV) in shrews. Because ANV is widely believed to be a learned response, the best approach is to avoid the development of ANV by adequate prophylaxis and treatment of acute vomiting and nausea from the first exposure to therapy. Behavioral treatment techniques, such as systematic desensitization, progressive muscle relaxation, and hypnosis have been shown to be effective against ANV.

=== Radiation therapy ===
The incidence and severity of radiation therapy-induced nausea and vomiting (RINV) depends on a number of factors including therapy related factors such as irradiated site, single and total dose, fractionation, irradiated volume and radiotherapy techniques. Also involved are person related factors such as gender, general health of the person, age, concurrent or recent chemotherapy, alcohol consumption, previous experience of nausea, vomiting, anxiety as well as the tumor stage. The emetogenic potential of radiotherapy is classified into high, moderate, low and minimal risk depending on the site of irradiation:

- High risk: total body irradiation (TBI) is associated with a high risk of RINV
- Moderate risk: radiation of the upper abdomen, half body irradiation and upper body irradiation
- Low risk: radiation of the cranium, spine, head and neck, lower thorax region and pelvis
- Minimal risk: radiation of extremities and breast

== Pathophysiology ==
Nausea and vomiting may have a number of causes in people with cancer. While more than one cause may exist in the same person stimulating symptoms via more than one pathway, the actual cause of nausea and vomiting may be unknown in some people. The underlying causes of nausea and vomiting may in some cases not be directly related to the cancer. The causes may be categorized as disease-related and treatment-related.

The stimuli which lead to emesis are received and processed in the brain. It is thought that a number of loosely organized neuronal networks within the medulla oblongata probably interact to coordinate the emetic reflex. Some of the brain stem nuclei which have been identified as important in the coordination of the emetic reflex include the parvicellular reticular formation, the Bötzinger complex and the nucleus tractus solitarii. The nuclei coordinating emesis had formerly been referred to as the vomiting complex, but it is no longer thought to represent a single anatomical structure.

Efferent outputs which transmit the information from the brain leading to the motoric response of retching and vomiting include vagal efferents to the esophagus, stomach and intestine as well as spinal somatomotor neurones to the abdominal muscles and phrenic motor neurones (C3–C5) to the diaphragm. Autonomic efferents also supply the heart and airways (vagus), salivary glands (chorda tympani) and skin and are responsible for many of the prodromal signs such as salivation and skin pallor.

Nausea and vomiting may be initiated by various stimuli, through different neuronal pathways. A stimulus may act on more than one pathway. Stimuli and pathways include:

- Toxic substances in the gastrointestinal tract: toxic substances (including drugs which are used in the treatment of cancer) in the lumen of the gastrointestinal tract stimulate vagal afferent nerves in the gut mucosa which communicate to the nucleus tractus solitarii and the area postrema to initiate vomiting and nausea. A number of receptors on the terminal ends of the vagal afferent nerves have been identified as being involved in this process, including the 5-hydroxytryptamine3 (5-HT3), neurokinin-1, and cholecystokinin-1 receptors. Various local mediators located in enterochromaffin cells of the gut mucosa play a role in stimulating these receptors. Of these 5-hydroxytryptamine seems to play the dominating role. This pathway has been postulated to be the mechanism by which some anti-cancer drugs such as cisplatin induce emesis.
- Toxic substances in the blood: toxic substances which have been absorbed into the blood (including cytostatics) or endogenous toxic (waste) material released by body or cancer cells into the blood can be detected directly in the area postrema of the brain and trigger the emetic reflex. The area postrema is a structure located on the floor of the fourth ventricle around which the blood–brain barrier is permeable, thus allowing for the detection of humoral or pharmacological stimuli in the blood or cerebrospinal fluid. This structure contains receptors which form a chemoreceptor trigger zone. Some of the receptors and neurotransmitters involved in the regulation of this emetic pathway include dopamine type D2, serotonin types 2–4 (5HT2–4), histamine type 1(H1), and acetylcholine (muscarinic receptors type 1 to 5, M1–5). Some other receptors such as substance P, cannabinoid type 1 (CB1) and the endogenous opioids may also be involved.
- Pathological conditions of the gastrointestinal tract: diseases and pathological conditions of the GIT may also lead to nausea and vomiting through direct or indirect stimulation of the above named pathways. Such conditions may include malignant bowel obstruction, hypertrophic pyloric stenosis and gastritis. Pathological conditions in other organs which are linked to the above named emetic pathways may also lead to nausea and vomiting, such as the myocardial infarction (through stimulation of cardiac vagal afferents) and kidney failure.
- Stimulation of the central nervous system: certain stimuli of the central nervous system may induce the emetic reflex. These include fear, anticipation, brain trauma and increased intracranial pressure. Of particular relevance to cancer patients in this regard are the stimuli of fear and anticipation. Evidence suggests that cancer patients may develop the side effects of nausea and vomiting in anticipation of chemotherapy. In some patients, re-exposure to cues such as smell, sounds or sight associated with the clinic or previous treatment may evoke anticipatory nausea and vomiting.
- Pathological conditions of the vestibular system: a disturbance of the vestibular system such as in motion sickness or Ménière's disease can induce the emetic reflex. Such disturbances of the vestibular system could also be cancer related such as in cerebral or vestibular secondaries (metastasis), or cancer treatment related such as the use of opioids.

== Patient Reported Outcomes ==
Patient reported outcomes (PROs) allow patients to voice their perspective on health and behavioral status through self administered questionnaires. Cancer and nausea have been measured with the Patient Reported Outcomes Measurement System (PROMIS) using surveys with questions such as "in the last 7 days, how severe was your nausea?". PROs can aid clinicians in tailoring nausea treatment specific to variations in high or low emetogenic chemotherapy from patient to patient. One notable benefit of PROs is that surveys can be administered electronically, meaning patients who are too sick to go to the doctor can do it from home.

Limitations: While helpful, PROs are subject to bias since they are reported after the symptoms are experienced. Errors in patients' memories can influence their PROs compared to if they had been asked while experiencing nausea rather than afterwards. This can lead to ratings which may not accurately reflect how patients perceive their nausea at the moment.

== Management ==
The strategies of management or prevention of nausea and vomiting depend on the underlying causes, whether they are reversible or treatable, stage of the illness, the person's prognosis and other person specific factors. Anti emetic drugs are chosen according to previous effectiveness and side effects.

=== Medication ===
Drugs that are used in the prophylaxis and therapy of nausea and vomiting in cancer include:

- 5-HT3 antagonists: 5-HT3 antagonists produce their anti emetic effect by blocking of the amplifying effect of serotonin on peripheral and central 5-HT3 receptors located on the various vagal afferent nerve endings and the chemoreceptor trigger zone. They are effective in the treatment and prophylaxis of CINV as well as in malignant bowel obstruction and kidney failure which are associated with elevated serotonin levels. These substances include dolasetron, granisetron, ondansetron, palonosetron, and tropisetron. They are often used in combination with other anti emetic drugs in people with high risk of emesis or nausea and are recommended as the most effective anti emetics in the prophylaxis of acute CINV.
- Corticosteroids: such as dexamethasone are used in the treatment of emesis as a result of chemotherapy, malignant bowel obstruction, raised intracranial pressure and in the chronic nausea of advanced cancer, though their exact mode of action remain unclear. Dexamethasone is recommended for use in the acute prevention of highly, moderately, and low emetogenic chemotherapy and in combination with aprepitant for the prevention of delayed emesis in highly emetogenic chemotherapy.
- NK1 receptor antagonists: such as Aprepitant block the NK1 receptor in the brainstem and gastrointestinal tract. Their antiemetic activity when added to a 5-HT3 receptor antagonist plus dexamethasone has been shown in several phase II double-blind studies.
- Cannabinoids: are a useful adjunct to modern anti emetic therapy in selected patients. They show a combination of weak anti emetic efficacy with potentially beneficial side effects such as sedation and euphoria. However, their usefulness is generally limited by the high incidence of toxic effects, such as dizziness, dysphoria, and hallucinations. Some studies have shown that cannabinoids are slightly better than conventional anti emetics such as metoclopramide, phenothiazines and haloperidol in the prevention of nausea and vomiting. Cannabinoids are an option in affected people who are intolerant or refractory to 5-HT3 antagonists or steroids and aprepitant as well as in refractory nausea and vomiting and rescue anti emetic therapy.
- Prokinetic agents such as metoclopramide
- Dopamine receptor antagonists such as phenothiazines (prochlorperazine and chlorpromazine), haloperidol, olanzapine, and levomepromazine, block D2 receptors found in the chemoreceptor trigger zone
- Antihistaminic agents like promethazine block H1 receptors in the vomiting center of the medulla, the vestibular nucleus, and the chemoreceptor trigger zone
- Anticholinergic agents such as scopolamine (hyoscine) are used as anti emetics as they relax smooth muscle and reduce gastrointestinal secretions by blockade of muscarinic receptors. They may be useful in the management of terminal bowel obstruction
- Somatostatin analoga such as octreotide are used for the palliation of malignant bowel obstruction, especially when there is high output vomiting not responding to other measures
- Cannabidiol is used as a palliative treatment (non-curative symptomatic treatment) and improves numerous symptoms that frequently appear during chemotherapy like nausea, vomiting, loss of appetite, physical pain or insomnia. Due to the large number of cannabinoid receptors (CB1 and CB2) distributed throughout the gastrointestinal (GI) tract, these substances can help to control and treat many GI diseases where vomiting and nausea are frequent.

=== Side Effects ===
Side effects of antiemetic drugs are relatively mild. Depending on the type of drug and dosage prescribed, common side effects may include: headache, constipation, diarrhea, insomnia, agitation, acne, weight loss/weight gain, dizziness, or drowsiness. In addition, although cannabis has proven extremely beneficial for emetic relief, a small percentage of patients opting to use medical cannabis have shown to become dependent on it after treatment concludes.

=== Nonmedical Interventions ===
Other non-drug measures may include:

- Diet: Small palatable meals are normally tolerated better than big meals in people affected by nausea and vomiting in cancer. Carbohydrate meals are better tolerated than spicy, fatty and sweet foods. Cool, fizzy drinks are found to be more palatable than still or hot drinks.
- The avoidance of environmental stimuli, such as sights, sounds, or smells that may initiate nausea. Patients who have become conditioned to feel nauseas after chemotherapy by treatment setting, sights, sounds, or smells associated with chemotherapy can be treated (albeit with varying levels of effectiveness) by introducing a new flavor or odor to unpair the conditioned stimuli.
- Instructional placebo interventions have shown varying outcomes, but experiments have not found any clinically significant changes in nausea levels.
- Behavioral approaches, such as distraction, relaxation training and cognitive behavioural therapy, yoga, and guided imagery may also be useful.
- Alternative medicine: acupuncture, and ginger have been shown to have some anti emetic effects on chemotherapy-induced emesis and anticipatory nausea, but have not been evaluated in the nausea of far advanced disease. Additionally, the effectiveness of ginger may be dampened by perceptions of it being a weak antiemetic.

=== Palliative surgery ===
Palliative care is the active care of people with advanced, progressive illness such as cancer. The World Health Organization (WHO) defines it as an approach that improves the quality of life of patients and their families facing the problems associated with life-threatening illness, through the prevention and relief of suffering by means of early identification and impeccable assessment and treatment of pain and other problems (such as nausea or vomiting), physical, psychosocial, and spiritual.

Sometimes it is possible or necessary to provide relief for cancer-caused nausea and vomiting through palliative surgical intervention. Surgery is however not routinely carried out when there are poor prognostic criteria for surgical intervention such as intra-abdominal carcinomatosis, poor performance status and massive ascites. The surgical approach proves beneficial in affected people with operable lesions, a life expectancy greater than two months and good performance status. Often a malignant bowel obstruction is the cause of the symptoms in which case the purpose of palliative surgery is to relieve the symptoms of bowel obstruction by means of several procedures including:

- Stoma formation
- Bypass of the obstruction
- Resection of bowel segments
- Placement of stents.
- Percutaneous endoscopic gastrostomy (PEG) tube placement to enable gastric venting.
- Gastric venting through a nasogastric tube is a semi-invasive possibility for palliation of nausea and vomiting due to gastrointestinal obstruction in people with abdominal malignancies who decline surgery or where surgery may not be indicated. However nasogastric tubes are not recommended to be used over a long period of time because of the high risk of displacement, poor tolerance, restrictions in daily routine activities, coughing, clearing pulmonary secretions and can be cosmetically unacceptable and confining. Complications of nasogastric tubes include aspiration, hemorrhage, gastric erosion, necrosis, sinusitis and otitis.

== Epidemiology ==
In 2008, 12.7 million new cancer cases and 7.6 million cancer deaths were estimated worldwide.

- Nausea or vomiting occur in 50–70% of people with advanced cancer.
- 50–80% of people undergoing radiotherapy experience nausea and/or vomiting, depending on the site of irradiation.
- Anticipatory nausea and vomiting is experienced by approximately 20–30% of people undergoing chemotherapy.
- Chemotherapy-induced nausea and vomiting resulting from treatment with highly emetogenic cytotoxic drugs can be prevented or effectively treated in 70 to 80% of affected people.

== Financial implications ==
Individual: CINV has shown to bring a heavy financial burden on cancer patients. These costs may discourage patients from seeking treatment or purchasing medication despite nausea being one of the most debilitating side effects of chemotherapy. In addition to hospital fees, studies have found that costs incurred for prescription antiemetics averaged between $100–1400 per chemotherapy cycle depending on the drugs prescribed.

Healthcare system: In addition to patient costs, CINV also takes a heavy financial toll on the healthcare system at large. General cancer symptom management has shown to make up 5% of annual hospital expenses, with the cost of CINV changing with antiemetic treatment. It was found that people receiving prophylactic treatment posed a significantly lower burden on the healthcare system. In contrast, patients who received no prophylactic treatment were shown to pose a substantial cost to the healthcare system. These additional costs have shown to be associated with repeated hospital visits and emergency medication for uncontrolled CINV.

== See also ==
- Antiemetic
- Chemotherapy-induced nausea and vomiting
- Management of cancer
