= BEACOPP =

BEACOPP is a chemotherapy regimen for treatment of Hodgkin lymphoma developed by the German Hodgkin Study Group used for patients in Stages > II or early (IA or IB) with unfavorable risk factors. Patients typically receive treatment in cycles of 21 days with no drugs given on days 15–21. There also exists a more intensive regimen with cycles of 14 days. Usually a course of BEACOPP therapy consists of four, sometimes six to eight cycles, or in combination with ABVD. In some countries BEACOPP still is experimental, in others (e.g. Germany and Austria) it is a standard therapy. In the United States, ABVD (or Stanford V) is generally given instead, because of the possibility of BEACOPP inducing more secondary neoplasias (such as leukemias), although the final results from a clinical trial (GHSG HD14) indicate that "there were no overall differences in treatment-related mortality or secondary malignancies" of BEACOPP relative to ABVD.

Some believe that the BEACOPP regimen is used less often in the US for cost reasons:

- Twice as many infusion per cycle relative to ABVD;
- Requirement for G-CSF support, which was under patent protection in the US until 2013 (as Neupogen by Amgen), while that patent protection expired in the EU in 2008;
- Higher likelihood of adverse events requiring hospitalization, such as infection or acute toxicity;

However, BEACOPP delivers approximately 7% points success relative to ABVD for early unfavorable Hodgkin lymphoma (as measured five-year freedom from treatment failure) and 12% points greater success relative to ABVD for advanced Hodgkin lymphoma (Stage IIB with risk factors or stages III and IV) as measured by seven-year freedom from treatment failure.

Predecessors of BEACOPP were COPP and (the earliest) MOPP.

In the some countries, including the UK, a revised type of BEACOPP called BEACOPDAC (which replaces the Procarbazine with Dacarbazine) is preferred in recent years due to possible reduced toxicity.

== Dosing regimen ==
Drug	Base BEACOPP	Dose-Escalated BEACOPP	Method	Cycle Day
(B)leomycin	10 mg/m^{2}	10 mg/m^{2}	i.v. push	day 8
(E)toposide	100 mg/m^{2}	200 mg/m^{2}	i.v. infusion	day 1–3
(A)driamycin (doxorubicin)	25 mg/m^{2}	35 mg/m^{2}	i.v. push	day 1
(C)yclophosphamide	650 mg/m^{2}	1250 mg/m^{2}	i.v. infusion	day 1
(O)ncovin=Vincristine	1.4 mg/m^{2} (max 2 mg)	1.4 mg/m^{2} (max 2 mg)	i.v. infusion	day 8
(P)rocarbazine	100 mg/m^{2}	100 mg/m^{2}	orally	day 1–7
(P)rednisone	40 mg/m^{2}	40 mg/m^{2}	orally	day 1–14

== See also ==
- Stanford V
- ABVD
