= IMEP (chemotherapy) =

IMEP is a chemotherapy regimen that is effective for nasal NK-/T-cell lymphoma. This chemotherapy regimen was also tested in Hodgkin lymphoma as a part of a multidrug alternating scheme COPP/ABV/IMEP. But in that setting it showed no advantage in efficacy and toxicity compared to the use of ABVD or the alternating COPP/ABVD scheme.

== Drug regimen ==
| Drug | Dose | Mode | Days |
|---|---|---|---|
| Ifosfamide | 1500 mg/m^{2} with mesna | IV infusion | Days 1-3 |
| Methotrexate | 30 mg/m^{2} | IV bolus | Days 3 and 10 |
| Etoposide | 100 mg/m^{2} | IV infusion | Days 1-3 |
| Prednisone | 120 mg | PO qd | Days 1-5 |
