= MOPP (chemotherapy) =

MOPP is a combination chemotherapy regimen used to treat Hodgkin lymphoma. The acronym is derived from the component drugs of the regimen:

- Mustargen (also known as mechlorethamine, chlormethine, mustine, nitrogen mustard, or MSD)
- Oncovin (also known as vincristine or VCR)
- Procarbazine
- Prednisone

== Process ==
Mechlorethamine and vincristine are administered intravenously, while procarbazine and prednisone are pills taken orally. A newer Hodgkin lymphoma treatment is ABVD.

C-MOPP involves switching the nitrogen mustard from mechlorethamine to cyclophosphamide. C-MOPP is thus very similar to COPP, using the same four agents and differing at most in dosages and timing.

== History ==
MOPP was the first combination chemotherapy that achieved a high success rate. It was developed at the National Cancer Institute.

Although no longer the most effective combination, MOPP is still used after relapse or where the patient has certain allergies or lung or heart problems which prevents the use of another regimen.

== Side effects ==
There is 20% chance of developing a second cancer within 20 years of MOPP treatment. As a result, MOPP is rarely used for treatment for Hodgkin lymphoma. MOPP has been known to cause alopecia (hair loss) and skin sensitivity (especially to sunlight). Nausea, vomiting, and stomach ache are common, as are chills, constipation, and frequent urination. Permanent sterility is a frequent side effect.

== See also ==
- ABVD – Chemotherapy regimen used to treat Hodgkin lymphoma
- BEACOPP
- CHOP – Treatment for non-Hodgkin lymphoma
- Stanford V – chemotherapy regimen
