= IMEP =

IMEP may refer to:

- Indicated mean effective pressure
- Inner Mongolia Education Press
- Institut de Microélectronique, Electromagnétisme et Photonique of the École nationale supérieure d'électronique et de radioélectricité de Grenoble
- Internet MANET Encapsulation Protocol, a kind of ad hoc routing protocol
- IMEP (chemotherapy)

== See also ==
- KIMEP University of Kazakhstan
