= Procarbazine =

Chemotherapy medication used for several cancer types

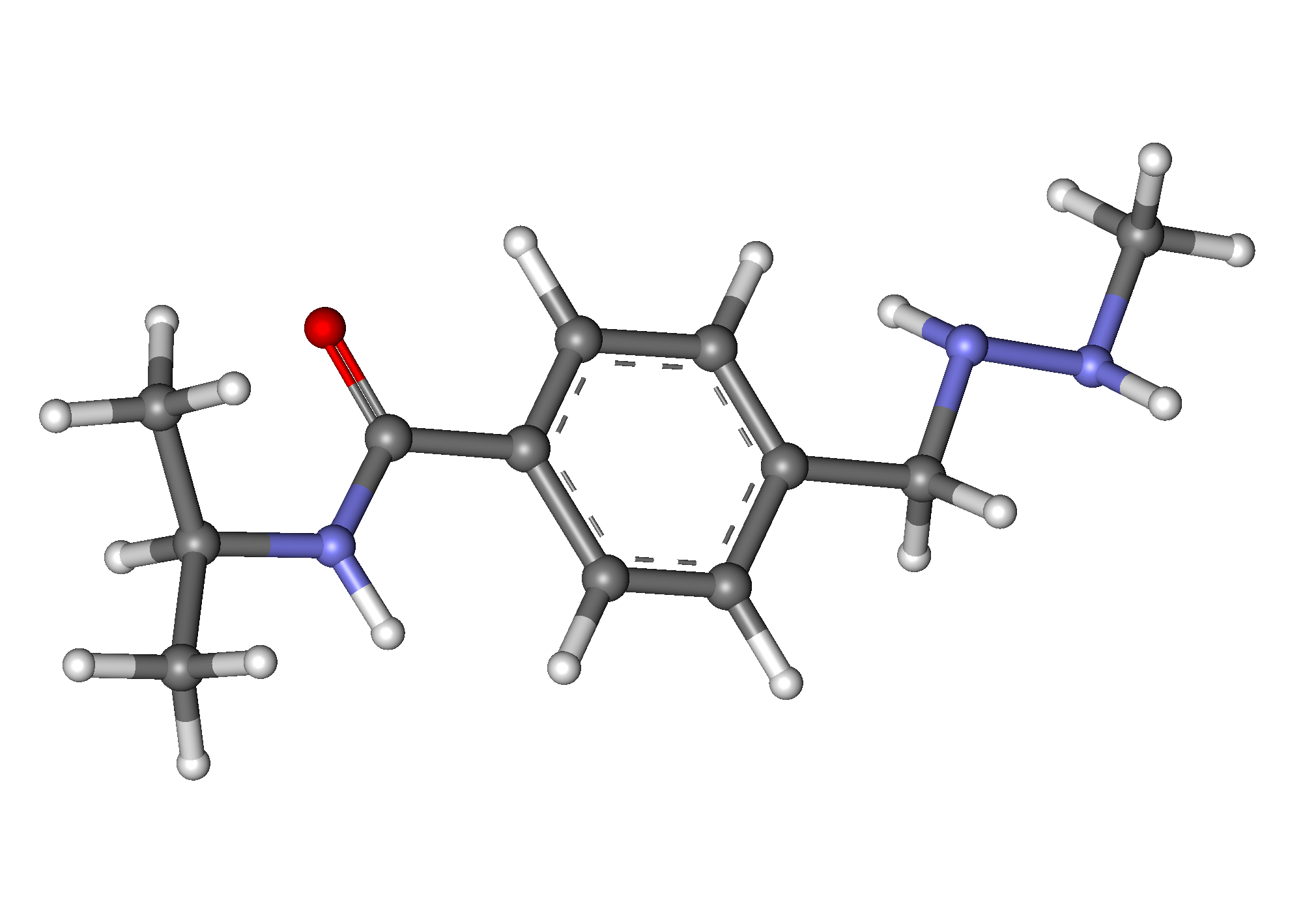

Clinical data
- Trade names: Matulane, Natulan, Indicarb, others
- AHFS/Drugs.com: Monograph
- MedlinePlus: a682094
- Pregnancy category: AU: D
- Routes of administration: By mouth (gel capsule), intravenous
- ATC code: L01XB01 (WHO)

Legal status
- Legal status: In general: ℞ (Prescription only)

Pharmacokinetic data
- Metabolism: liver, kidney
- Elimination half-life: 10 minutes
- Excretion: kidney

Identifiers
- IUPAC name: N-Isopropyl-4-[(2-methylhydrazino)methyl]benzamide
- CAS Number: 671-16-9
- PubChem CID: 4915
- IUPHAR/BPS: 7278
- DrugBank: DB01168
- ChemSpider: 4746
- UNII: 35S93Y190K
- KEGG: D08423
- ChEBI: CHEBI:71417
- ChEMBL: ChEMBL1321
- CompTox Dashboard (EPA): DTXSID4021189
- ECHA InfoCard: 100.010.531

Chemical and physical data
- Formula: C_{12}H_{19}N_{3}O
- Molar mass: 221.304 g·mol^{−1}
- 3D model (JSmol): Interactive image
- SMILES: O=C(c1ccc(cc1)CNNC)NC(C)C
- InChI: InChI=1S/C12H19N3O/c1-9(2)15-12(16)11-6-4-10(5-7-11)8-14-13-3/h4-7,9,13-14H,8H2,1-3H3,(H,15,16); Key:CPTBDICYNRMXFX-UHFFFAOYSA-N

Procarbazine is a chemotherapy medication used for the treatment of Hodgkin lymphoma and brain cancers. For Hodgkin lymphoma it is often used together with chlormethine, vincristine, and prednisone while for brain cancers such as glioblastoma multiforme it is used with lomustine and vincristine. It is typically taken by mouth.

Common side effect include low blood cell counts and vomiting. Other side effects include tiredness and depression. It is not recommended in people with severe liver or kidney problems. Use in pregnancy is known to harm the baby. Procarbazine is in the alkylating agents family of medication. How it works is not clearly known.

Procarbazine was approved for medical use in the United States in 1969. It is on the World Health Organization's List of Essential Medicines. In the United Kingdom a month of treatment cost the National Health Service 450 to 750 pounds.

== Medical uses ==
When used to treat Hodgkin lymphoma, it is often delivered as part of the BEACOPP regimen that includes bleomycin, etoposide, adriamycin, cyclophosphamide, vincristine (tradename Oncovin), prednisone, and procarbazine. The first combination chemotherapy developed for Hodgkin lymphoma (HL), MOPP also included procarbazine (ABVD has supplanted MOPP as standard first line treatment for HL, with BEACOPP as an alternative for advanced/unfavorable HL). Alternatively, when used to treat certain brain tumors (malignant gliomas), it is often dosed as PCV when combined with lomustine (often called CCNU) and vincristine.

Dose is adjusted for kidney disease or liver disease.

== Side effects ==
Very common (greater than 10% of people experience them) adverse effects include loss of appetite, nausea and vomiting. Other side effects of unknown frequency include reduction in leukocytes, reduction in platelets, reduction in neutrophils, which can lead to increased infections including lung infections; severe allergy-like reactions that can lead to angioedema and skin reactions; lethargy; liver complications including jaundice and abnormal liver function tests; reproductive effects including reduction in sperm count and ovarian failure.

When combined with ethanol, procarbazine may cause a disulfiram-like reaction in some people.

It weakly inhibits MAO in the gastrointestinal system, so it can cause hypertensive crises if associated with the ingestion of tyramine-rich foods such as aged cheeses; this appears to be rare.

Procarbazine rarely causes chemotherapy-induced peripheral neuropathy, a progressive, enduring, often irreversible tingling numbness, intense pain, and hypersensitivity to cold, beginning in the hands and feet and sometimes involving the arms and legs.

== Pharmacology ==
Procarbazine works, in part, as an alkylating agent and methylates guanine at the O-6 position (much like dacarbazine also does). Guanine is one of the four nucleotides that makes up DNA. The methylated DNA is prone to breakage, and RNA and protein synthesis is inhibited. Proliferating cancer cells need to replicate their DNA and undergo programmed cell death (apoptosis) in response to DNA strand breaks. Normal or non-proliferating cells are more apt to repair the DNA damage, but still some of the healthy cells will be damaged. Procarbazine is metabolized in the liver to an azo-derivative and then further metabolized by the cytochrome P-450 system to an active azoxy-derivative.
