= ABVD =

Chemotherapy regimen used to treat Hodgkin lymphoma

ABVD is a chemotherapy regimen used in the first-line treatment of Hodgkin lymphoma, replacing the older MOPP protocol. It consists of concurrent treatment with the chemotherapy drugs:

- Adriamycin (also known as doxorubicin/hydroxydaunorubicin, designated as H in CHOP)
- Bleomycin
- Vinblastine
- Dacarbazine (similar to procarbazine, designated as P in MOPP and in COPP)

== Medical uses ==
As of 2007, ABVD is widely used as the initial chemotherapy treatment for newly diagnosed Hodgkin lymphoma. It has been the most effective and least toxic chemotherapy regimen available for treating early-stage Hodgkin Lymphoma. The other chemotherapy regimens that are widely used in this setting is the Stanford V and BEACOPP regimens.

=== Administration ===
One cycle of ABVD chemotherapy is typically given over 4 weeks in two doses, with the first on day 1 and the second dose on day 15. All four of the chemotherapy drugs are given intravenously. ABVD chemotherapy is usually given in the outpatient setting — that is, it does not require hospitalization.

Typical dosages for one 28-day cycle of ABVD are:

Drug	Dose	Mode	Days
Adriamycin	25 mg/m^{2}	IV bolus	Days 1 and 15
Bleomycin	10 IU/m^{2}	IV bolus	Days 1 and 15
Vinblastine	6 mg/m^{2}	IV bolus	Days 1 and 15
Dacarbazine	375 mg/m^{2}	IV infusion	Days 1 and 15

Dosages above are given according to the body surface area dosing model.

The number of cycles given depends upon the stage of the disease and how well the patient tolerates chemotherapy. Doses may be delayed because of neutropenia, thrombocytopenia, or other side effects.

A FDG PET scan is commonly advised following the completion of ABVD to assess response to the therapy. Interim PET (following 2 cycles) may be useful in aiding prognostication, but does not yet guide changes in therapy except within clinical trial protocols.

== Side effects ==
Side effects of ABVD can be divided into acute (those occurring while receiving chemotherapy) and delayed (those occurring months to years after completion of chemotherapy). Delayed side effects have assumed particular importance because many patients treated for Hodgkin lymphoma are cured and can expect long lives after completion of chemotherapy.

=== Acute side effects ===
- Hair loss, or alopecia, is a fairly common but not universal side effect of ABVD. Hair that is lost returns in the months after completion of chemotherapy.
- Nausea and vomiting can occur with ABVD, although treatments for chemotherapy-induced nausea and vomiting have improved substantially (see Supportive care below).
- Low blood counts, or myelosuppression, occur about 50% of the time with ABVD. Blood cell growth factors are sometimes used to prevent this (see Supportive care below). Blood counts are checked frequently while receiving chemotherapy. Any fever or sign of infection that develops needs to be promptly evaluated; severe infections can develop rapidly in a person with a low white blood cell count due to chemotherapy.
- Allergic reactions to bleomycin can occur. A small test dose of bleomycin is often given prior to the first round of ABVD to screen for patients who may be allergic.
- Chemotherapy-induced peripheral neuropathy, a progressive and enduring tingling numbness, intense pain, and hypersensitivity to cold, beginning in the hands and feet and sometimes involving the arms and legs.

=== Delayed side effects ===
- Infertility is probably infrequent with ABVD. Several studies have suggested that, while sperm counts in men decrease during chemotherapy, they return to normal after completion of ABVD. In women, follicle-stimulating hormone levels remained normal while receiving ABVD, suggesting preserved ovarian function. Regardless of these data, fertility options (e.g. semen cryopreservation, oocyte cryopreservation, embryo cryopreservation) should be discussed with an oncologist before beginning ABVD therapy.
- Pulmonary toxicity, or lung damage, can occur with the use of bleomycin in ABVD, especially when radiation therapy to the chest is also given as part of the treatment for Hodgkin lymphoma. This toxicity develops months to years after completing chemotherapy, and usually manifests as cough and shortness of breath. High concentrations of oxygen, such as those often used in surgery, can trigger lung damage in patients who have received bleomycin, even years later. Pulmonary function tests are often used to assess for bleomycin-related damage to the lungs. One study found bleomycin lung damage in 18% of patients receiving ABVD for Hodgkin lymphoma. Retrospective analyses have questioned whether bleomycin is necessary at all; however, at this point it remains a standard part of ABVD.
- Cardiac toxicity, or cardiomyopathy, can be a late side effect of adriamycin. The occurrence of adriamycin-related cardiac toxicity is related to the total lifetime dose of adriamycin, and increases sharply in people who receive a cumulative dose of more than 400 mg/m^{2}. Almost all patients treated with ABVD receive less than this dose (for 6 cycles of ABVD, the cumulative adriamycin dose is 300 mg/m^{2}); therefore, adriamycin-related cardiac toxicity is very uncommon with ABVD.
- Secondary malignancies: patients cured of Hodgkin lymphoma remain at increased risk of developing other (secondary) cancers. Treatment-related leukemias are uncommon with ABVD, especially as compared with MOPP. However, one study found a risk of second cancers as high as 28% at 25 years after treatment for Hodgkin lymphoma, although most of the patients in this study were treated with MOPP chemotherapy rather than ABVD. Many of these second cancers were lung cancers or, in women, breast cancers, emphasizing the importance of smoking cessation and regular preventive care after completion of treatment. Radiation and chemotherapy probably both play a role in the development of these secondary malignancies; the exact contribution of chemotherapy such as ABVD can be difficult to tease out.

== Supportive care ==
Supportive care refers to efforts to prevent or treat side effects of ABVD chemotherapy, and to help people get through the chemotherapy with the least possible discomfort.

=== Antiemetics ===
Significant advances in antiemetic, or anti-nausea, medications have been made in the beginning of the 21st century. Patients will often receive a combination of 5-HT_{3} receptor antagonists (e.g. ondansetron), corticosteroids, and benzodiazepines before chemotherapy to prevent nausea. These medicines are also effective after nausea develops, as are phenothiazines. Each person's sensitivity to nausea and vomiting varies. Overall, while patients often experience some mild to moderate nausea, severe nausea or vomiting are uncommon with ABVD.

Emetogenicity is high. eviQ has recommendations for preventing nausea and vomiting.

Ensure that patients have sufficient antiemetics for breakthrough emesis with Metoclopramide 10 mg to 20 mg every 4 to 6 hours when necessary OR Prochlorperazine 10 mg PO or 12.5 mg IV every 4 to 6 hours when necessary.

=== Growth factors ===
Blood growth factors are medicines that stimulate the bone marrow to produce more of a certain kind of blood cell. Commonly used examples include G-CSF and erythropoietin. These drugs are sometimes used with ABVD to prevent neutropenia (low white blood cell count) and anemia related to the chemotherapy, although their use is not universal.

== History ==
Prior to the mid-1960s, advanced-stage Hodgkin lymphoma was treated with single-agent chemotherapy, with fairly poor long-term survival and cure rates. With advances in the understanding of chemotherapy resistance and the development of combination chemotherapy, Vincent T. DeVita and George Canellos at the National Cancer Institute (United States) developed the MOPP regimen. This combination of mechlorethamine, vincristine (Oncovin), procarbazine, and prednisone proved capable of curing almost 70% of patients with advanced-stage Hodgkin lymphoma.

While MOPP was remarkably successful in curing advanced Hodgkin lymphoma, its toxicity remained significant. Aside from bone marrow suppression, frequent side effects included nerve injury caused by vincristine and allergic reactions to procarbazine. Long-term effects were also a concern, as patients were often cured and could expect long survival after chemotherapy. Infertility was a major long-term side effect, and even more seriously, the risk of developing treatment-related myelodysplasia or acute leukemia was increased up to 14-fold in patients who received MOPP. These treatment-related hematological malignancies peaked at 5 to 9 years after treatment for Hodgkin lymphoma, and were associated with a very poor prognosis.

=== Development ===
Therefore, alternative regimens were tested in an attempt to avoid alkylating agents (such as mechlorethamine), which were thought to be responsible for many of the long-term side effects of MOPP. ABVD was developed as a potentially less toxic and more effective alternative to MOPP; the initial results of ABVD were published in an Italian thesis. The results were published in English in 1975 by an Italian group led by Gianni Bonadonna. A number of trials then compared MOPP vs. MOPP plus ABVD and compared ABVD to previous and other regimens for Hodgkin lymphoma. A large trial by CALGB suggested that ABVD was superior to MOPP, with a higher rate of overall response, less hematologic toxicity, better relapse-free survival, and better outcomes after relapse in the patients treated with ABVD. Later studies confirmed the superiority of ABVD in terms of effectiveness, and also demonstrated that late side effects, such as treatment-related acute leukemia, were less common with ABVD as compared to MOPP. Taken together, these results led ABVD to the replacement of MOPP with ABVD in the first-line treatment of Hodgkin lymphoma. A number of trials then compared ABVD or ABVD-like or hybrid MOPP/ABVD to BEACOPP and escalated BEACOPP regimens.

== Research ==
=== Fertility ===
Scientists analyzed samples of ovarian tissue donated by eight women who had undergone ABVD chemotherapy, alongside tissue from fifteen healthy women.

They found that the tissue from the cancer patients treated with ABVD had between four and 10 times more eggs compared with tissue from women who had received a different chemotherapy, or healthy women of a similar age. The ovarian tissue was in healthy condition, appearing similar to tissue from young women's ovaries.

Although the eggs are in an immature state, the scientists are trying to discover how they were created, then work out a way to bring them to maturity. It is unclear if the eggs in their current form would be functional.

== See also ==
- BEACOPP
- CHOP
- Stanford V
- Hodgkin lymphoma
