= COPP (chemotherapy) =

COPP is a chemotherapy regimen for treatment of Hodgkin lymphoma, consisting of concurrent treatment with Cyclophosphamide, Oncovin, Procarbazine and Prednisone.

Compared with the similar MOPP regimen for both pediatric and adult cases, COPP uses less procarbazine (it is given only for 10 days in cycle instead of 14), and it replaces the very toxic mechlorethamine with cyclophosphamide, which is safer for progenitor stem cells (and hence less prone to causing severe neutropenia) and carries a lower risk of secondary malignancies.

Thus the COPP regimen is considered safer and less toxic than MOPP. But the benefits are offset by its lower efficacy, especially in advanced-stage Hodgkin lymphoma.

Nevertheless, both the COPP and the MOPP are now supplanted by ABVD, which is less toxic and more effective than either COPP or MOPP.

== Dosage ==
Drug	Dose	Mode	Days
Cyclophosphamide	600 mg/m^{2}	IV infusion	Days 1 and 8
Oncovin	1.4 mg/m^{2} (max. 2 mg)	IV bolus	Days 1 and 8
Procarbazine	100 mg/m^{2}	PO qd	Days 1-10
Prednisone	40 mg/m^{2}	PO qd	Days 1-14
