= Stanford V =

Stanford V (usually spoken as Stanford Five), is a chemotherapy regimen (with accompanying radiation therapy) intended as a first-line treatment for Hodgkin lymphoma. The regimen was developed in 1988, with the objective of maintaining a high remission rate while reducing the incidence of acute and long term toxicity, pulmonary damage, and sterility observed in alternative treatment regimens such as ABVD. The chemical agents used are:

- A mustard derivative such as cyclophosphamide, chlormethine or ifosfamide
- Doxorubicin, an anti-tumor antibiotic
- Vinblastine, an alkaloid cell toxin
- Vincristine, another alkaloid cell toxin
- Bleomycin, another anti-tumor antibiotic
- Etoposide, a DNA toxin
- Prednisone, a corticosteroid

== Drug Regimen ==
The chemotherapy part of Stanford V treatment can last anywhere from 8 to 12 weeks, depending on the staging of the disease. In many cases, this is followed by radiation therapy for anywhere from 2 to 6 weeks to the affected areas of the body.

Stanford V is a more rigorously administered form of chemotherapy, with treatments roughly twice as fast as those of other Hodgkin lymphoma treatments. However, in a randomized controlled study, Stanford V was inferior to ABVD. This study has been criticize for not adhering to the proper Stanford V protocol. Specifically, the radiation therapy component following chemotherapy was not properly administered in the Italian study. A retrospective study from the Memorial Sloan-Kettering Cancer Center displayed results similar to the Stanford Cancer Center's own experience. The study concluded that, "Stanford V with appropriate radiotherapy is a highly effective regimen for locally extensive and advanced HL."

Drug	Dose	Mode	Days
Doxorubicin	25 mg/m^{2}	IV	Days 1 and 15
Vinblastine	6 mg/m^{2}	IV	Days 1 and 15
Chlormethine	6 mg/m^{2}	IV	Day 1
Vincristine	1.4 mg/m^{2} (max 2 mg)	IV	Days 8 and 22
Bleomycin	5 units/m^{2}	IV	Days 8 and 22
Etoposide	60 mg/m^{2}	IV	Days 15, 16
Prednisone	40 mg/m^{2}	PO	Q2D
