= Gastric erosion =

Damage to the mucous membrane of the stomach

Gastric erosion occurs when the mucous membrane lining the stomach becomes inflamed. Specifically, the term "erosion" in this context means damage that is limited to the mucosa, which consists of three distinct layers: the epithelium (in the case of a healthy stomach, this is non-ciliated simple columnar epithelium), the basement membrane, and the lamina propria. An erosion is different from an ulcer, which is an area of damage to the gastrointestinal wall (in this case the gastric wall) that extends deeper through the wall than an erosion; an ulcer can extend anywhere from beyond the lamina propria to right through the wall, potentially causing a perforation.

Some drugs, as tablets, can irritate this mucous membrane, especially drugs taken for arthritis and muscular disorders, steroids, and aspirin. A gastric erosion may also occur because of emotional stress, or as a side effect of burns or stomach injuries. See acute gastritis.

== Symptoms ==
There is basically one symptom of gastric erosion: bleeding from the area where the stomach lesion is. Bowel movements may contain blood. Vomit may be bloody as well, but a gastric erosion may not cause vomiting. Blood may be black because it will be partially digested. Loss of blood may cause one to develop anemia.

== Risks ==
Anemia and other problems related to blood loss may occur. Sometimes a person with a gastric erosion will experience severe bleeding all at once; red (bloody) vomiting and/or black bowel movements may occur.

== Sources ==
- "Gastric Erosion." Encyclopædia Britannica, Micropaedia. Encyclopædia Britannica Inc., 1998 ed.
