= Vincristine =

Chemical compound; chemotherapy medication

Clinical data
- Pronunciation: /ˈvɪnˈkrɪstiːn/
- Trade names: Oncovin, others
- Other names: leurocristine ki
- AHFS/Drugs.com: Monograph
- MedlinePlus: a682822
- License data: US DailyMed: Vincristine
- Pregnancy category: AU: D
- Routes of administration: intravenous
- ATC code: L01CA02 (WHO)

Legal status
- Legal status: AU: S4 (Prescription only); CA: ℞-only; UK: POM (Prescription only); US: ℞-only

Pharmacokinetic data
- Bioavailability: n/a (not reliably absorbed by the GI tract)
- Protein binding: ~44%
- Metabolism: Liver, mostly via CYP3A4 and CYP3A5
- Elimination half-life: 19 to 155 hours (mean: 85 hours)
- Excretion: Faeces (70–80%), urine (10–20%)

Identifiers
- IUPAC name: (3aR,3a1R,4R,5S,5aR,10bR)-Methyl 4-acetoxy-3a-ethyl-9-((5S,7S,9S)-5-ethyl-5-hydroxy-9-(methoxycarbonyl)-2,4,5,6,7,8,9,10-octahydro-1H-3,7-methano[1]azacycloundecino[5,4-b]indol-9-yl)-6-formyl-5-hydroxy-8-methoxy-3a,3a1,4,5,5a,6,11,12-octahydro-1H-indolizino[8,1-cd]carbazole-5-carboxylate
- CAS Number: 57-22-7
- PubChem CID: 5978
- IUPHAR/BPS: 6785
- DrugBank: DB00541
- ChemSpider: 5758
- UNII: 5J49Q6B70F
- KEGG: D08679
- ChEBI: CHEBI:28445
- ChEMBL: ChEMBL303560
- CompTox Dashboard (EPA): DTXSID1032278
- ECHA InfoCard: 100.000.289

Chemical and physical data
- Formula: C_{46}H_{56}N_{4}O_{10}
- Molar mass: 824.972 g·mol^{−1}
- 3D model (JSmol): Interactive image
- SMILES: CC[C@@]1(C[C@@H]2C[C@@](C3=C(CCN(C2)C1)C4=CC=CC=C4N3)(C5=C(C=C6C(=C5)[C@]78CCN9[C@H]7[C@@](C=CC9)([C@H]([C@@]([C@@H]8N6C=O)(C(=O)OC)O)OC(=O)C)CC)OC)C(=O)OC)O
- InChI: InChI=1S/C46H56N4O10/c1-7-42(55)22-28-23-45(40(53)58-5,36-30(14-18-48(24-28); Key:OGWKCGZFUXNPDA-XQKSVPLYSA-N

Vincristine, also known as leurocristine and sold under the brand name Oncovin among others, is a chemotherapy medication used to treat a number of types of cancer. This includes acute lymphocytic leukemia, acute myeloid leukemia, Hodgkin lymphoma, neuroblastoma, and small cell lung cancer among others. It is given intravenously.

Most people experience some side effects from vincristine treatment. Commonly it causes a change in sensation, hair loss, constipation, difficulty walking, and headaches. Serious side effects may include neuropathic pain, lung damage, or low white blood cells which increases the risk of infection. Use during pregnancy may result in birth defects. It works by stopping cells from dividing properly. It is vital that it not be given intrathecally, as this may kill.

Vincristine was first isolated in 1961. It is on the World Health Organization's List of Essential Medicines. It is a vinca alkaloid that can be obtained from the Madagascar periwinkle Catharanthus roseus.

== Medical uses ==
Vincristine is delivered via intravenous infusion for use in various types of chemotherapy regimens. Its main uses are in non-Hodgkin lymphoma as part of the chemotherapy regimen CHOP R-CVP, Hodgkin lymphoma as part of MOPP, COPP, BEACOPP, or the less popular Stanford V chemotherapy regimen, in acute lymphoblastic leukemia (ALL) as part of the VAMP regimen, and in treatment for nephroblastoma as well as the chemotherapy regimen VDC-IE for Ewing's sarcoma. It is also used to induce remission in ALL with dexamethasone and L-asparaginase, and in combination with prednisone to treat childhood leukemia. Vincristine is occasionally used as an immunosuppressant, for example, in treating thrombotic thrombocytopenic purpura (TTP) or chronic idiopathic thrombocytopenic purpura (ITP).

== Side effects ==
The main side effects of vincristine are chemotherapy-induced peripheral neuropathy, hyponatremia, constipation, and hair loss.

Vincristine-induced neuropathy is the main dose-limiting side effect. Chemotherapy-induced peripheral neuropathy can be severe, and may be a reason to reduce or avoid using vincristine. The symptoms are progressive and enduring tingling numbness, pain and hypersensitivity to cold, beginning in the hands and feet and sometimes affecting the arms and legs. One of the first symptoms of peripheral neuropathy is foot drop: A person with a family history of foot drop and/or Charcot–Marie–Tooth disease (CMT) should avoid vincristine. A 2021 study has suggested that anakinra can reduce the neuropathy.

Accidental injection of vinca alkaloids into the spinal canal (intrathecal administration) is highly dangerous, with a mortality rate approaching 100 percent. The medical literature documents cases of ascending paralysis due to massive encephalopathy and spinal nerve demyelination, accompanied by intractable pain, almost uniformly leading to death. Several patients have survived after aggressive and immediate intervention. Rescue treatments consist of washout of the cerebrospinal fluid and administration of protective medications. Children may do better following this injury. One child, who was aggressively treated at the time of the injection, recovered almost completely with only mild neurological deficits. A significant series of inadvertent intrathecal vincristine administration occurred in China in 2007 when batches of cytarabine and methotrexate (both often used intrathecally) manufactured by the company Shanghai Hualian were found to be contaminated with vincristine.

The overuse of vincristine may also lead to drug resistance by overexpression of the p-glycoprotein pump (Pgp). There is an attempt to overcome resistance by the addition of derivatives and substituents to the vincristine molecule.

== Mechanism of action ==
Vincristine works partly by binding to the tubulin protein, stopping the tubulin dimers from polymerizing to form microtubules, causing the cell to be unable to separate its chromosomes during the metaphase. The cell then undergoes apoptosis. The vincristine molecule inhibits leukocyte production and maturation. A downside, however, to vincristine is that it does not only affect the division of cancer cells. It affects all rapidly dividing cell types, making it necessary for the very specific administration of the drug.

== Chemistry ==
The natural extraction of vincristine from Catharanthus roseus is produced at a percent yield of less than 0.0003%. For this reason, alternate methods to produce synthetic vincristine are being used. Vincristine is created through the semi-synthesis coupling of indole alkaloids vindoline and catharanthine in the vinca plant. It can also now be synthesized through a stereocontrolled total synthesis technique which retains the correct stereochemistry at C18' and C2'. The absolute stereochemistry at these carbons is responsible for vincristine's anticancer activity.

The liposome encapsulation of vincristine enhances the efficacy of the vincristine drug while simultaneously decreasing the neurotoxicity associated with it. Liposome encapsulation increases vincristine's plasma concentration and circulation lifetime in the body, and allows the drug to enter cells more easily.

== History ==
Having been used as a folk remedy for centuries, studies in the 1950s revealed that the rosy periwinkle Catharanthus roseus contained over 120 alkaloids, many of which are biologically active, the two most significant being vincristine and vinblastine. Its use as an anti-tumor, anti-mutagenic agent is well documented in the ancient Ayurveda system of medicine and in the folk culture of Madagascar and Southern Africa. It was not found to be anti-diabetic in double blinded controlled studies. While initial studies for its use in diabetes mellitus were disappointing, the discovery that it caused myelosuppression (decreased activity of the bone marrow) led to its study in mice with leukemia, whose lifespan was prolonged by the use of a vinca preparation. Treatment of the ground plant with Skellysolve-B (hexane), followed by dilute tartaric acid and benzene extraction, provided an active fraction. This fraction was further chromatographed on deactivated aluminium oxide using trichloromethane and benzene, and separation by pH using extraction with various buffers to yield vincristine.

Vincristine was approved by the US Food and Drug Administration (FDA) in July 1963 under the brand name Oncovin and was marketed by Eli Lilly and Company. The drug was initially developed by a team at Lilly Research Laboratories in Indianapolis where it was demonstrated that vincristine cured artificially induced leukemia in mice and remission of acute leukemias of childhood.

Production of vincristine required one ton of dried periwinkle leaves to produce one ounce of vincristine. The periwinkle was grown on a ranch in Texas.

== Society and culture ==
=== Suppliers ===
Two generic drug makers were suppliers of vincristine in the United States: Teva and Pfizer. In 2019 Teva stopped producing vincristine, leaving Pfizer as the only company in production. Teva has said that they will restart production, and expect it to be available in 2020.

=== Shortage ===
In October 2019 an impending shortage was reported; no adequate substitute is known for treating childhood cancers. By 2022, the shortage of vincristine continued.

=== Controversy ===
==== Pharmaceutical bioprospecting ====
Vincristine's origins are debated as an example of pharmaceutical bioprospecting in the fields of ethnobotany and ethnomedicine. Some consider the Catharanthus roseus plant from which vincristine is derived, and its folk remedies to be endemic to Madagascar, and that Madagascar was denied royalties from vincristine sales. However, Catharanthus roseus has a documented history in folk medicine treatments in other locations. In 1963, Lilly researchers acknowledged that the plant was used in Brazil to treat hemorrhage, scurvy, toothaches, and chronic wounds; in the British West Indies to treat diabetic ulcers; and in the Philippines and South Africa as an oral hypoglycemic agent – but not as a treatment for cancer.

Catharanthus roseus has been a cosmopolitan species since before the Industrial Revolution and the plant's use in folk remedies suggested general bioactivity for diabetes treatment, not cancer. In the mid-eighteenth century, botanist Judith Sumner recorded the arrival of Catharanthus roseus at London's Chelsea Physic Garden from the Jardin des plantes in Paris. It's unclear how the plant first arrived in Paris and the details of its origins in Madagascar beyond reports of its transport from Madagascar by early European explorers. Vincristine was initially distributed at cost to increase accessibility, though later switched to a for-profit model to recover the costs of production and development. According to Michael Brown, vincristine may not be a tidy example of pharmaceutical bioprospecting, but it demonstrates how pharmaceuticals with a history of use in folk medicine have intellectual property claims which are difficult to untangle.

==== Vincristine and confusion with other drugs in administration ====
Vincristine has been involved in a number of medical errors. Multiple instances of vincristine having been administered improperly, after having been confused with other drugs, have occurred. If delivered into the spine (intrathecal) it causes paralysis and usually death.

In 2003, two Australian oncology pharmacists recommended a solution. The suggested procedure is to prepare and administer vincristine in a small volume mini-bag rather than a syringe thus physically preventing the vincristine syringe being accidentally attached to a spinal needle. Acceptance of this safer procedure has been slow.

Following the death of Wayne Jowett in 2001 after the inadvertent intrathecal administration of vincristine, Professor Brian Toft’s inquiry recommended the development of spinal needles and syringes that were physically incompatible with intravenous devices. This recommendation informed subsequent work by the UK Department of Health, the National Patient Safety Agency, manufacturers and international standards organisations, contributing to the development of the ISO 80369 series of small-bore connector standards, including ISO 80369-6 (NRFit) for neuraxial applications.

== Research ==
In 2012, the US Food and Drug Administration (FDA) approved a liposomal formulation of vincristine branded as Marqibo. Marqibo was voluntarily withdrawn from the US market in November 2021.

A nano-particle bound version of vincristine was under development as of 2014.

In 1995 and 2006, Malagasy agronomists and American political ecologists studied the production of Catharanthus roseus around Fort Dauphin and Ambovombe and its export as a natural source of the alkaloids used to make vincristine, vinblastine and other vinca alkaloid cancer drugs. Their research focused on the wild collection of periwinkle roots and leaves from roadsides and fields and its industrial cultivation on large farms.
