= Serotonin receptor antagonist =

Neurotransmission-modulating substance

A serotonin antagonist, or serotonin receptor antagonist, is a drug used to inhibit the action of serotonin and serotonergic drugs at serotonin (5-HT) receptors.

== Types ==
=== 5-HT_{2A} antagonists ===
Antagonists of the 5-HT_{2A} receptor are sometimes used as atypical antipsychotics (contrast with typical antipsychotics, which are purely dopamine antagonists).

They include, but are not limited to:

- Cyproheptadine blocks 5-HT_{2A}, H1 and is a mild anticholinergic.
- Methysergide is a 5-HT_{2A} antagonist and nonselective 5-HT_{1} receptor blocker. It causes retroperitoneal fibrosis and mediastinal fibrosis.
- Quetiapine blocks 5-HT_{2A}, 5-HT_{1A}, dopamine receptors D_{1} and D_{2}, histamine receptor H1, and a1 adrenoreceptors.

==== 5-HT_{2A/2C} antagonists ====
- Ketanserin Antihypertensive. Blocks 5-HT_{2A}, 5-HT_{2C} and Alpha 1 (a1) adrenoreceptors.
- Risperidone antipsychotic
- Trazodone
- Nefazodone

=== 5-HT_{3} antagonists ===
Another subclass consists of drugs selectively acting at the 5-HT_{3} receptors, and thus are known as 5-HT_{3} antagonists. They are effective at treating chemotherapy-induced emesis and postoperative nausea and vomiting.

They include, but are not limited to:

- Dolasetron
- Granisetron
- Ondansetron
- Palonosetron
- Tropisetron

Other 5-HT_{3} antagonists have been considered for use in the treatment of irritable bowel syndrome:

- Alosetron
- Cilansetron

Also, the antidepressant mirtazapine acts as a 5-HT_{3} antagonist.

=== Non-selective 5-HT antagonists ===
Although some non-selective serotonin antagonists may have a particular affinity for a specific 5-HT receptor (and thus may be listed below e.g., methysergide), they still may also possess a generalised non-selective action.

They include, but are not limited to:

- Chlorpromazine
- Cyproheptadine
- Metergoline
- Methysergide
- Mianserin
- Mirtazapine
- Oxetorone
- Pizotifen
- Propranolol
- Ritanserin
- Spiperone

=== Antihistamines with antiserotonergic activity ===
- Carbinoxamine
- Cinnarizine
- Cyproheptadine
- Hydroxyzine
- Methdilazine
- Pizotifen
- Promethazine
- Pizotifen is a 5-HT_{2C} antagonist, H1 blocker and anticholinergic useful in migraine prophylaxis.
- Oxatomide
- Oxetorone Also used in the treatment of migrane.
- Ketotifen

=== Others ===
- Fenclonine (para-chlorophenylalanine; PCPA) An inhibitor of serotonin synthesis that has been used in the treatment of carcinoid syndrome.
- Feverfew Is a herb traditionally used for migraines (contains parthenolide).
- Reserpine Depletes serotonin stores in the brain, heart, and many other organs and has been used in hypertension and psychosis
- Gamma-mangostin from Garcinia mangostana

== See also ==
- Serotonin receptor agonist
