= Zatosetron =

Chemical compound

Clinical data
- ATC code: none

Identifiers
- IUPAC name: 5-chloro-2,2-dimethyl-N-(8-methyl-8-azabicyclo[3.2.1]oct-3-yl)-2,3-dihydro-1-benzofuran-7-carboxamide
- CAS Number: 123482-22-4
- PubChem CID: 60763
- ChemSpider: 16736584
- UNII: 901MC95XSB
- CompTox Dashboard (EPA): DTXSID8043997

Chemical and physical data
- Formula: C_{19}H_{25}ClN_{2}O_{2}
- Molar mass: 348.87 g·mol^{−1}
- 3D model (JSmol): Interactive image
- SMILES: CC1(Cc2cc(cc(c2O1)C(=O)N[C@H]3C[C@H]4CC[C@@H](C3)N4C)Cl)C
- InChI: InChI=1S/C19H25ClN2O2/c1-19(2)10-11-6-12(20)7-16(17(11)24-19)18(23)21-13-8-14-4-5-15(9-13)22(14)3/h6-7,13-15H,4-5,8-10H2,1-3H3,(H,21,23)/t13-,14+,15-; Key:SPKBYQZELVEOLL-QDMKHBRRSA-N

Zatosetron (LY-277,359) is a drug which acts as an antagonist at the 5HT_{3} receptor It is orally active and has a long duration of action, producing antinauseant effects but without stimulating the rate of gastrointestinal transport. It is also an effective anxiolytic in both animal studies and human trials, although with some side effects at higher doses.

== See also ==
- Ondansetron
- Bemesetron
- Granisetron
- Ricasetron
- Tropanserin
- Tropisetron
