= C8H15NO =

The molecular formula C_{8}H_{15}NO (molar mass: 141.21 g/mol, exact mass: 141.1154 u) may refer to:

- 3,3-Diethyl-2-pyrrolidinone (DEABL)
- Hygrine
- Pseudotropine (PTO)
- Tropine
- Heptyl isocyanate
