= O-Acylpseudotropine =

Class of chemical compounds

General chemical structure of an O-acylpseudotropine

An O-acylpseudotropine is any derivative of pseudotropine in which the alcohol group is substituted with an acyl group.

Acylpseudotropines are formed by the action of the enzyme pseudotropine acyltransferase on pseudotropine.

== See also ==
- Tropine
- Pseudotropine benzoate (tropacocaine)
- Atropine
- Tropinone
