= Peter Kranke =

German anesthesiologist (born 1973)

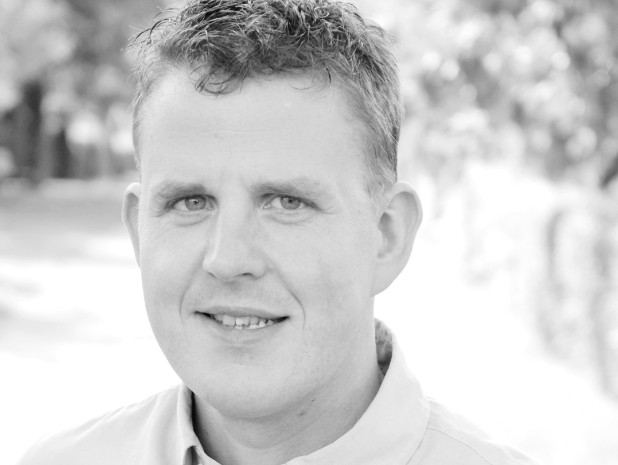
- Born: 10 July 1973 (age 53); Würzburg, West Germany
- Known for: Clinical research, clinical trials, evidence-based medicine, postoperative nausea and vomiting, patient safety, obstetric anaesthesia
- Scientific career
- Fields: Anesthesiology
- Workplaces: University of Würzburg

Peter Kranke (born 10 July 1973, Würzburg) is anesthetist and professor of anesthesiology at the University of Würzburg, Germany. Kranke is known for the design and conduct of clinical studies and for performing systematic reviews in the context of perioperative medicine. He published numerous papers on research focussed on evidence-based medicine and interventional and observational trials on postoperative nausea and vomiting and other issues in conjunction with perioperative medicine and associated topics including patient blood management. The area of his clinical responsibility and interest, among others, is the safe provision of anesthesia and analgesia in obstetrics and gynecology.

== Biography ==
Kranke studied medicine at the University of Würzburg from 1994 to 99, followed by a practical year (PJ) at the University of Heidelberg and at the Cantonal Hospital of Baden Switzerland. In 2000 he was promoted to doctor of medicine ("magna cum laude"). In 2005 he was approved as medical specialist in anesthesiology (consultant anesthetist) and was habilitated in the same year with a work on the application of evidence-based medicine in the perioperative period with special focus on postoperative nausea and vomiting (PONV). He also holds an MBA since 2005. In 2007 he was named senior physician at the Department of Anaesthesia and Critical Care at the University of Würzburg. There he heads the clinical research since 2008. In 2009 he was named full professor of anesthesiology at the University of Würzburg. Kranke also holds special titles for intensive care medicine, pain management palliative care, emergency medicine, acupuncture and medical quality management (Bavarian chamber of physicians) as well as qualifications with respect to the conduct of clinical trials (phase II to IV). The working group "clinical studies" and trial management, headed by Kranke, compiles systematic reviews on interventions in health care with associated economic benefit assessment according to the criteria of the cochrane collaboration, other systematic reviews and has a coordinating role with respect to clinical trials.

== Scientific contribution ==
The main area of expertise and emphasis of Kranke's scientific work was in the area of observational and interventional trials on risk factors for PONV as well as investigator initiated trials and industry-driven trials to investigate interventions aiming at the prevention or treatment of PONV. Among these trials, many studies were aiming to get a label for the indication of PONV prevention (phase II and III trials). Further, Kranke´s group conducted numerous systematic reviews on interventions in conjunction with the perioperative period, among other, various antiemetics. In addition, Kranke has set up and validated many tools and prognostic instruments with respect to the prediction of PONV and other adverse events in the perioperative phase, such as PONV and shivering. An additional emphasis was put on the pharmacoeconomic assessment and analysis and implementation studies and analyses on the impact of algorithms with regard to the quality of care. The focus on evidence-base medicine in anaesthesia soon led to the conduct of Cochrane Reviews and their regular update in the field of perioperative medicine and associated topics, a topic that still constitutes a main focus of the group. This expertise and focus has led to the participation in many consensus and guideline development groups. Apart from perioperative medicine in general, another area of research is in the field of obstetric anaesthesia and analgesia, quality of recovery and patient safety. Among others, Kranke's interest was in evaluating alternative methods for the provision of labour analgesia and its safe implementation in clinical practice. Very early, and based on results of conducted systematic reviews, Kranke and colleagues highlighted the suspicious trial results published by Fujii and colleagues. Findings, that were negated for a long time, but finally reconfirmed by subsequent, comprehensive analyses.

== Awards ==
- Admitted a Fellow of the European Society of Anaesthesiology and Intensive Care, FESAIC
- August-Bier-Preis of the DGAI (2018)
- Carl-Ludwig-Schleich Price of the DGAI (2016)
- ESA-Meta-Analysis Grant (2013)
- 1st Lilly Quality-of-Life Price (2004)

== Memberships ==
Between 2010 and 2019 Kranke was editor of the European Journal of Anaesthesiology, member of the expert panel of the journal Anästhesiologie Intensivmedizin Notfallmedizin Schmerztherapie and has had several positions within the European Society of Anaesthesiology (member and later chairman of the Scientific Committee for Evidence Based Medicine and Quality Improvement, member of the Scientific Committee on Obstetric Anaesthesia, Member of the Patient Safety and Quality Committee, member and later chairman of the Guideline Committee). Kranke is co-author of the recommendations by the international consensus conferences for the management of postoperative nausea and vomiting (PONV) including their regular updates as well as European recommendation for preoperative fasting and the S3-guidelines on fluid management in the perioperative period under the auspice of by the German Society of Anaesthesiology. Kranke is also a member of the Obstetric Committee (2016-2020) of the World Federation of Societies of Anaesthesiologists.

== Publications ==
Books

- Die Geburtshilfliche Anästhesie. Springer (2017). ISBN 978-3-662-54374-0
- Peter Kranke and Leopold Eberhart (Eds.) (2012), Übelkeit und Erbrechen in der perioperativen Phase (PONV): Risikoeinschätzung, Vermeidung und Therapie in der klinischen Praxis (in German), Deutscher Ärzte-Verlag (1000), ISBN 978-3769112863
- Leopold Eberhart and Peter Kranke (Eds.): Fast-Track-Anästhesie. UNI-MED; 1st ed. (December 2009) ISBN 3-8374-1193-1.

Book chapters (selection)

- P. Kranke, W. Wilhelm: "Anästhesie in der Geburtshilfe" in: Praxis der Anästhesiologie 1st ed., Editor: Wolfram Wilhelm. Springer Verlag; Kapitel: 50
- P. Kranke, M. Kippnich: "Anästhesie in der Gynäkologie" in: Praxis der Anästhesiologie 1st ed., Editor: Wolfram Wilhelm. Springer Verlag; Kapitel: 49
- L. Eberhart, P. Kranke, M. Anders, M. Reyle-Hahn: "Postoperative Phase" in: Die Anästhesiologie 3rd ed., Editor: Rossaint, Werner, Zwißler. Springer Verlag; Kapitel: 44

Scientific papers

- Research Gate publication list
- Pubmed publication list
