= C18H19N3O =

The molecular formula C_{18}H_{19}N_{3}O may refer to:

- Acridine carboxamide
- Ondansetron
