= Tropanserin =

Chemical compound

Clinical data
- ATC code: None

Identifiers
- IUPAC name: [(1R,5S)-8-methyl-8-azabicyclo[3.2.1]octan-3-yl] 3,5-dimethylbenzoate
- CAS Number: 85181-40-4 85181-38-0 (HCl)
- PubChem CID: 68600
- ChemSpider: 19969918
- UNII: 04B48I6VHR
- CompTox Dashboard (EPA): DTXSID0042618

Chemical and physical data
- Formula: C_{17}H_{23}NO_{2}
- Molar mass: 273.376 g·mol^{−1}
- 3D model (JSmol): Interactive image
- SMILES: CN3[C@H]1CC[C@@H]3C[C@@H](C1)OC(=O)c2cc(C)cc(C)c2
- InChI: InChI=1S/C17H23NO2/c1-11-6-12(2)8-13(7-11)17(19)20-16-9-14-4-5-15(10-16)18(14)3/h6-8,14-16H,4-5,9-10H2,1-3H3/t14-,15+,16+; Key:HDDNYFLPWFSBLN-ZSHCYNCHSA-N

Tropanserin (INN; MDL-72,422) is a drug which acts as a potent and selective 5-HT_{3} receptor antagonist. It was investigated in clinical trials for the treatment of migraine in the 1980s but was never marketed.

== Synthesis ==
Tropanserin can be prepared by the reaction of tropine with 3,5-dimethylbenzoyl chloride, releasing hydrogen chloride.

Tropanserin synthesis

== See also ==
- Bemesetron
- Zatosetron
- Ricasetron
- Granisetron
- Tropisetron
