= Ricasetron =

Chemical compound

Clinical data
- ATC code: none

Identifiers
- IUPAC name: endo-N-(8-Methyl-8-azabicyclo[3.2.1]oct-3yl)-2,3-dihydro-3,3-dimethyl-indole-1-carboxamide
- CAS Number: 117086-68-7
- PubChem CID: 14850173
- IUPHAR/BPS: 2302
- ChemSpider: 16736765
- UNII: R92JB88O88
- ChEMBL: ChEMBL2105377

Chemical and physical data
- Formula: C_{19}H_{27}N_{3}O
- Molar mass: 313.445 g·mol^{−1}
- 3D model (JSmol): Interactive image
- SMILES: CC1(CN(c2c1cccc2)C(=O)N[C@H]3C[C@H]4CC[C@@H](C3)N4C)C
- InChI: InChI=1S/C19H27N3O/c1-19(2)12-22(17-7-5-4-6-16(17)19)18(23)20-13-10-14-8-9-15(11-13)21(14)3/h4-7,13-15H,8-12H2,1-3H3,(H,20,23)/t13-,14+,15-; Key:ILXWRFDRNAKTDD-QDMKHBRRSA-N

Ricasetron (BRL-46470) is a drug which acts as a selective antagonist at the serotonin 5-HT_{3} receptor. It has antiemetic effects as with other 5-HT_{3} antagonists, and also has anxiolytic effects significantly stronger than other related drugs, and with less side effects than benzodiazepine anxiolytics. However, it has never been developed for medical use.

== See also ==
- Zatosetron
- Bemesetron
- Tropanserin
- Tropisetron
- Granisetron
