= Ulrike Protzer =

German Virologist

- Born: November 2, 1962 (age 63)
- Education: University of Erlangen
- Scientific career
- Fields: Virology
- Workplaces: Technical University of Munich

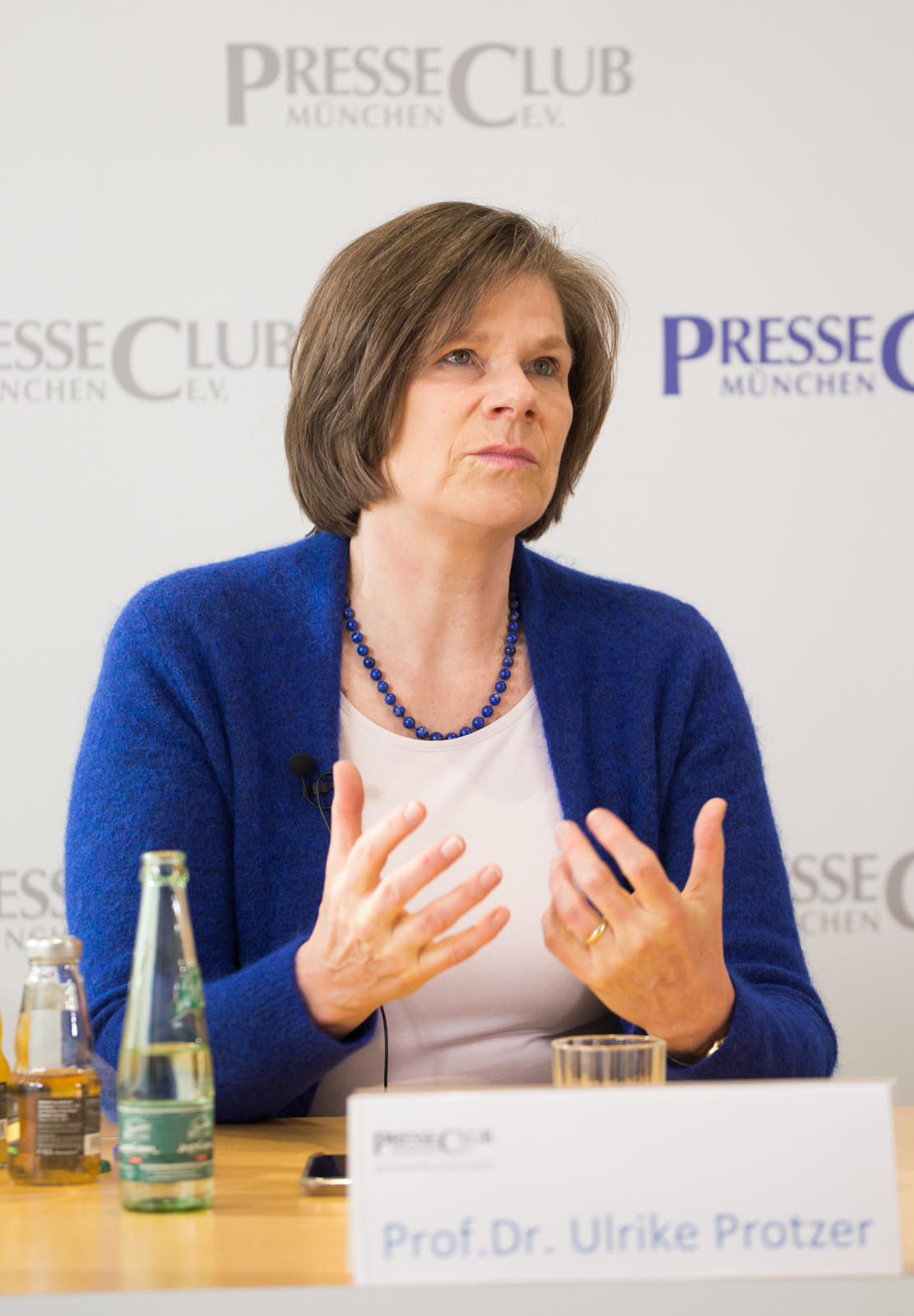
Ulrike Protzer at the International Press Club of Munich on March 8, 2022.

Ulrike Protzer is a German virologist who has been a professor at the Chair of Virology at the Technical University of Munich (TUM) since 2007. Her primary field of study is virus-host interactions of the hepatitis B virus and her work is focused on developing new therapeutic approaches for the treatment of chronic hepatitis B infection and related secondary diseases. Since the beginning of the COVID-19 pandemic, the novel virus SARS-CoV-2 has also been one of her research areas, and she has been a prominent voice in German media on this topic.

== Life and career ==
Protzer was born on 2 November 1962. She studied medicine at the University of Erlangen from 1982 until 1988, where her thesis was on the topic of postoperative nausea, before qualifying as a specialist in Internal medicine in 1996. After this, she did a postdoctoral fellowship at Heidelberg University, where she studied Hepatitis B infection before becoming a group leader in the Institute of Virology there in 2000. In 2002, she become an Assistant Professor in Molecular Infectiology at the University of Cologne. In 2005, she qualified as a specialist in Medical Microbiology and Virology. At the end of 2007, as part of a dual appointment, she became director of the Institute for Virology at the Technical University of Munich and the Helmholtz Centre Munich, which she has headed ever since. The work of her research group focuses on Hepatitis B virus

Protzer is a member of numerous professional societies. She has been Deputy Chairwoman of the Board of Directors at the German Center for Infection Research (DZIF) since 2011., and is also on the board of the German Liver Foundation, and of the University Hospital Cologne. She has been a member of the organising committee of the International Meeting on Hepatitis B Viruses (HBV Meeting) since 2006

Since the beginning of the COVID-19 pandemic, she and her working group have also been researching SARS-CoV-2 and she has been a prominent voice in the media as an expert in this field. She was also appointed to the Bavarian Council of Experts on the Corona Crisis

Protzer is married and has two children.

== Honours and awards ==
- 2020 Heinz Maier-Leibnitz Medal
- 2021 DZIF Prize for Translational Infection Research
- 2022 Bavarian Order of Merit

== Selected publications ==
- Specific and nonhepatotoxic degradation of nuclear hepatitis B virus cccDNA, Science (2014)
- Living in the liver: hepatic infections, Nature Reviews Immunology (2012)
- Metabolic Activation of Intrahepatic CD8^{+} T Cells and NKT Cells Causes Nonalcoholic Steatohepatitis and Liver Cancer via Cross-Talk with Hepatocytes, Cancer Cell (2014)
- Hepatitis B virus X protein is essential to initiate and maintain virus replication after infection, Journal of Hepatology (2011)
- Investigation of a COVID-19 outbreak in Germany resulting from a single travel-associated primary case: a case series, The Lancet Infectious Diseases (2020)
- Multilevel proteomics reveals host perturbations by SARS-CoV-2 and SARS-CoV, Nature (2021)
