= C17H20N2O2 =

The molecular formula C_{17}H_{20}N_{2}O_{2} may refer to:

- Tropisetron, a serotonin 5-HT3 receptor antagonist
- Tropicamide, a medication used to dilate the pupil and help with examination of the eye
