= Alizapride =

Chemical compound

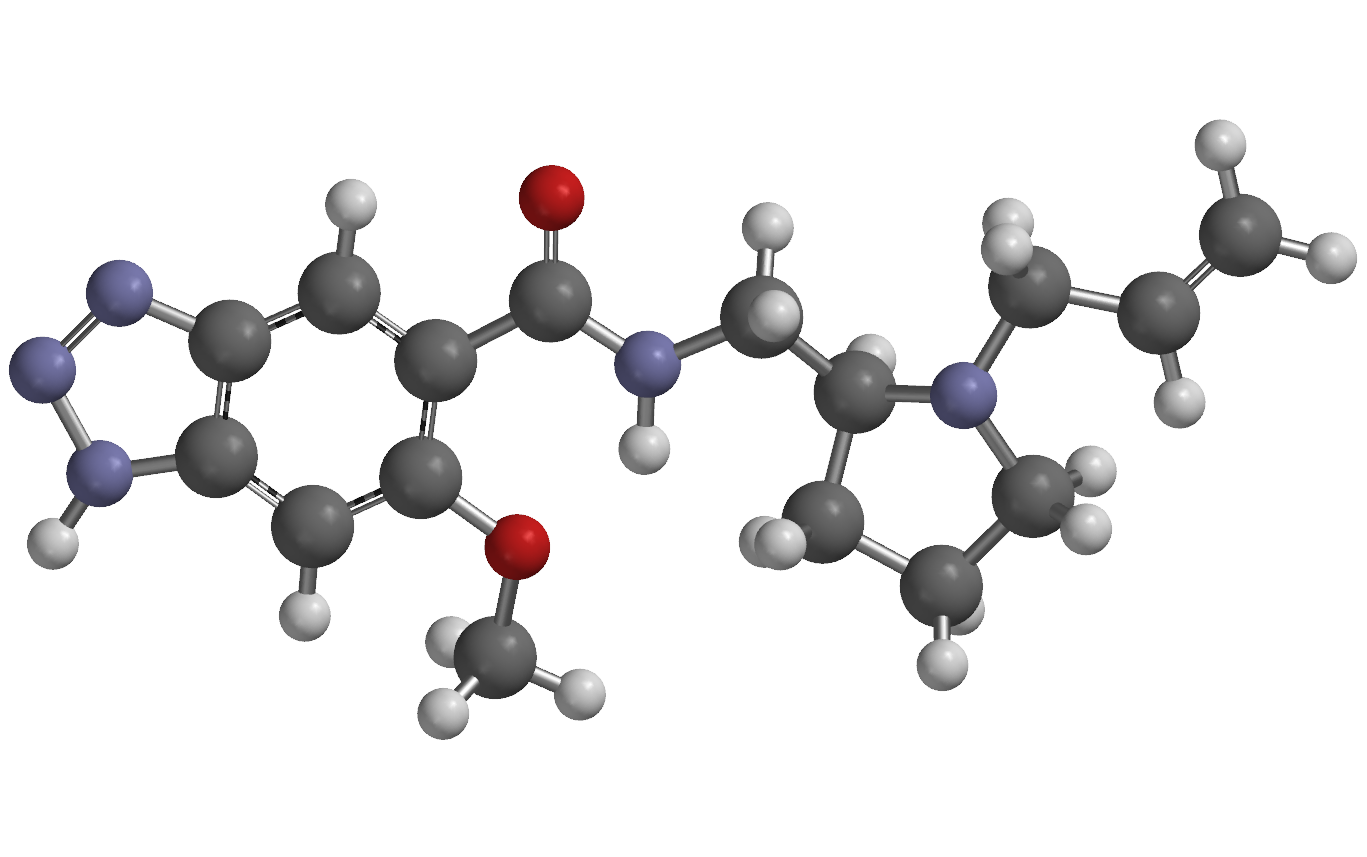

Clinical data
- AHFS/Drugs.com: International Drug Names
- Routes of administration: Oral, IM, IV
- ATC code: A03FA05 (WHO)

Legal status
- Legal status: In general: ℞ (Prescription only)

Pharmacokinetic data
- Elimination half-life: 3 hours
- Excretion: Renal

Identifiers
- IUPAC name: N-[(1-Allylpyrrolidin-2-yl)methyl]-6-methoxy-1H-benzo[d][1,2,3]triazole-5-carboxamide
- CAS Number: 59338-93-1
- PubChem CID: 43008
- DrugBank: DB01425
- ChemSpider: 39202
- UNII: P55703ZRZY
- KEGG: D07102
- ChEMBL: ChEMBL290194
- CompTox Dashboard (EPA): DTXSID10866755
- ECHA InfoCard: 100.056.082

Chemical and physical data
- Formula: C_{16}H_{21}N_{5}O_{2}
- Molar mass: 315.377 g·mol^{−1}
- 3D model (JSmol): Interactive image
- SMILES: C=CCN1CCCC1CNC(=O)c3cc2nn[nH]c2cc3OC
- InChI: InChI=1S/C16H21N5O2/c1-3-6-21-7-4-5-11(21)10-17-16(22)12-8-13-14(19-20-18-13)9-15(12)23-2/h3,8-9,11H,1,4-7,10H2,2H3,(H,17,22)(H,18,19,20); Key:KSEYRUGYKHXGFW-UHFFFAOYSA-N

Alizapride (Litican, Plitican, Superan, Vergentan) is a dopamine antagonist with prokinetic and antiemetic effects used in the treatment of nausea and vomiting, including postoperative nausea and vomiting. It is structurally related to metoclopramide and other benzamides.

== Mechanism ==
Alizapride blocks D2 dopamine receptors in the vomiting center.

Since alizapride is able to cross the blood-brain barrier, adverse effects may include temporary extrapyramidal motor disorders such as acute dystonia and dyskinesia.

It has a plasma half-life of 3 hours.

== Synthesis ==
The synthesis of Alizapride happens in multiple steps:

Synthesis of Alacepril

4-Aminosalicylic acid is first methylated using dimethyl sulfate. A nitro group is then introduced that is reduced using Raney nickel to afford an amino group. The two amino groups are then closed to a triazole ring using sodium nitrite and hydrochloric acid. This is then condensed with 1-allyl-2-aminomethylpyrrolidine to afford Alizapride.
