= Bemesetron =

Chemical compound

Clinical data
- ATC code: none

Identifiers
- IUPAC name: [(1S,5R)-8-methyl-8-azabicyclo[3.2.1]octan-3-yl] 3,5-dichlorobenzoate
- CAS Number: 40796-97-2
- PubChem CID: 671690
- ChemSpider: 10498629
- UNII: O98T3677PA
- ChEMBL: ChEMBL2107804
- CompTox Dashboard (EPA): DTXSID8042632
- ECHA InfoCard: 100.164.757

Chemical and physical data
- Formula: C_{15}H_{17}Cl_{2}NO_{2}
- Molar mass: 314.21 g·mol^{−1}
- 3D model (JSmol): Interactive image
- SMILES: CN3[C@@H]1CC[C@H]3C[C@H](C1)OC(=O)c2cc(Cl)cc(Cl)c2
- InChI: InChI=1S/C15H17Cl2NO2/c1-18-12-2-3-13(18)8-14(7-12)20-15(19)9-4-10(16)6-11(17)5-9/h4-6,12-14H,2-3,7-8H2,1H3/t12-,13+,14+; Key:MNJNPLVXBISNSX-WDNDVIMCSA-N

Bemesetron (MDL-72222) is a drug which acts as an antagonist at the 5HT_{3} receptor. It has antiemetic effects comparable to metoclopramide, however it is not used clinically, instead its main application is in scientific research studying the involvement of the 5HT_{3} receptor in the actions of drugs of abuse.

== See also ==
- Tropanserin
- Tropisetron
- Zatosetron
- Ricasetron
- Granisetron
