= Sara J. Dent =

Sara J. Dent was the first chief of Anesthesiology and the first female division chief in the Department of Surgery at Duke University. She assumed this role in 1968 and served as chair until 1971, when Dr. Merel H. Harmel became chair. She conducted the earliest high-impact clinical research in anesthesiology at Duke that focused on postoperative nausea and vomiting (PONV).

Dr. Dent was born in South Carolina and also founded the Orange County Rescue Squad located in Hillsborough, NC. She also served as County Coroner before her death in 1999.
