= C15H17Cl2NO2 =

The molecular formula C_{15}H_{17}Cl_{2}NO_{2} (molar mass: 314.207 g/mol) may refer to:

- Bemesetron (MDL-72222)
- Dichloropane
