= Facinicline =

Discontinued drug for Alzheimer's Disease and Schizophrenia

Names
- IUPAC name N-[(3S)-1-Azabicyclo[2.2.2]octan-3-yl]-1H-indazole-3-carboxamide
- Other names RG3487

Identifiers
CAS Number	677306-35-3; HCl: 677305-02-1
3D model (JSmol)	Interactive image
ChEMBL	ChEMBL2151439; HCl: ChEMBL5095032
ChemSpider	8145949; HCl: 8555915
PubChem CID	9970357; HCl: 10380472
UNII	6A6FX0J03K; HCl: O6J463N18M
- InChI: InChI=1S/C15H18N4O/c20-15(14-11-3-1-2-4-12(11)17-18-14)16-13-9-19-7-5-10(13)6-8-19/h1-4,10,13H,5-9H2,(H,16,20)(H,17,18)/t13-/m1/s1 Key: TXCYUSKWBHUVEP-CYBMUJFWSA-N
- SMILES: C1CN2CCC1[C@@H](C2)NC(=O)C3=NNC4=CC=CC=C43

Properties
Chemical formula	C_{15}H_{18}N_{4}O
Molar mass	270.336 g·mol^{−1}
- Except where otherwise noted, data are given for materials in their standard state (at 25 °C [77 °F], 100 kPa). Infobox references

Facinicline (development code RG3487) is a α7 nicotinic acetylcholine receptor partial agonist and antagonist to serotonin-3 receptors (5-HT_{3}). It demonstrated initial efficacy for treating cognitive impairment in Alzheimer's disease in a phase 2a trial, but development was discontinued following the conclusion of a later phase 2 trial.

A later study evaluating the effects of facinicline on cognitive deficits in schizophrenia failed to demonstrate an effect on its primary endpoints, although post-hoc analysis showed improvements in patients with high negative PANSS scores.

== Pharmacology ==
Facinicline is an a7 nicotinic partial agonist and 5-HT_{3} antagonist. Facinicline shares much of its structure with tropesitron, another α7 and 5HT3 agonist/antagonist.
