= Dolasetron =

Pharmaceutical drug

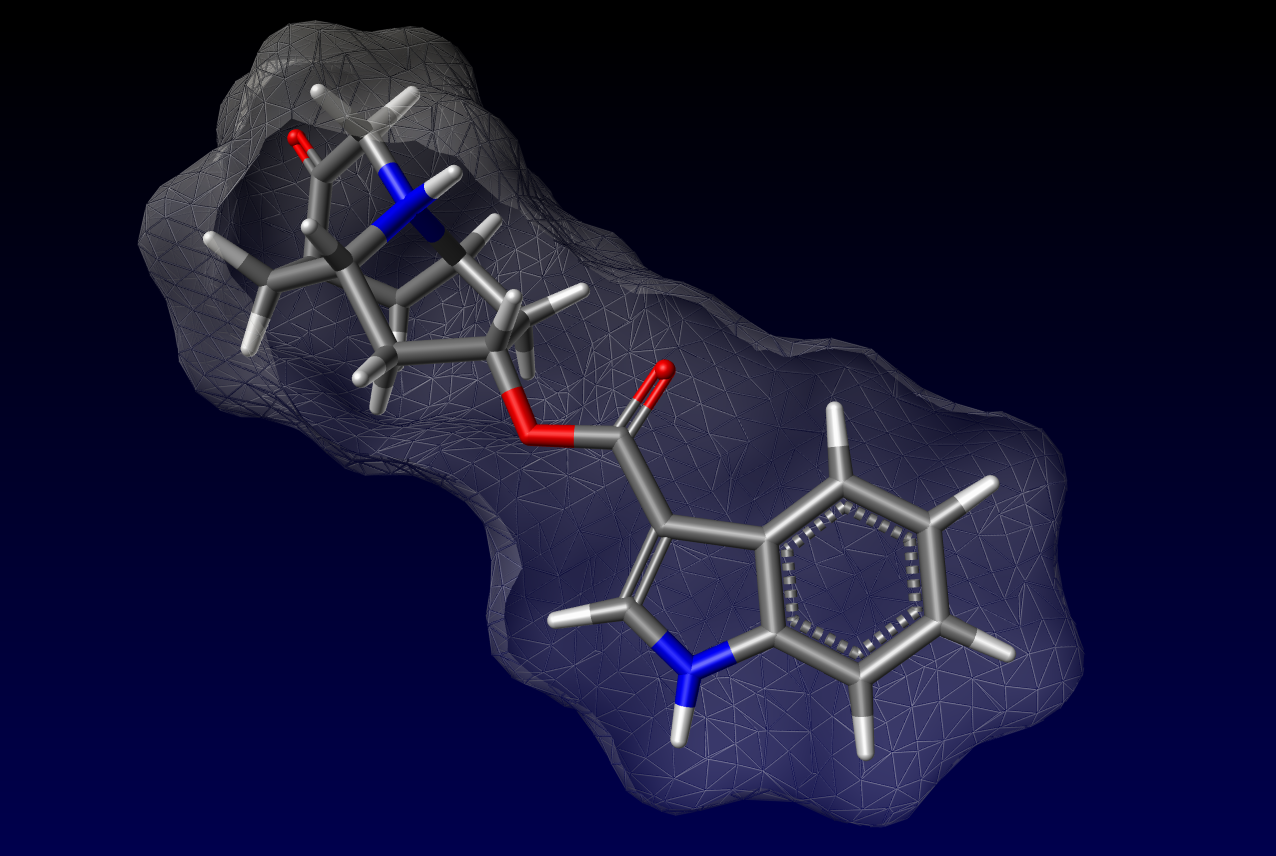

Clinical data
- AHFS/Drugs.com: Monograph
- MedlinePlus: a601001
- Pregnancy category: B (US)
- Routes of administration: Intravenous, by mouth
- ATC code: A04AA04 (WHO)

Legal status
- Legal status: In general: ℞ (Prescription only)

Pharmacokinetic data
- Protein binding: 69 to 77%
- Elimination half-life: 8.1 hours

Identifiers
- IUPAC name: (3R)-10-oxo-8-azatricyclo[5.3.1.0^{3,8}]undec-5-yl 1H-indole-3-carboxylate
- CAS Number: 115956-12-2
- PubChem CID: 60654
- DrugBank: DB00757
- ChemSpider: 16736416
- UNII: 82WI2L7Q6E
- KEGG: D07867
- ChEMBL: ChEMBL1201240
- CompTox Dashboard (EPA): DTXSID4048276
- ECHA InfoCard: 100.130.141

Chemical and physical data
- Formula: C_{19}H_{20}N_{2}O_{3}
- Molar mass: 324.380 g·mol^{−1}
- 3D model (JSmol): Interactive image
- SMILES: [H]C35C[C@@]4([H])CC(OC(=O)c1c[nH]c2ccccc12)C[C@@]([H])(C3)N4CC5=O
- InChI: InChI=1S/C19H20N2O3/c22-18-10-21-12-5-11(18)6-13(21)8-14(7-12)24-19(23)16-9-20-17-4-2-1-3-15(16)17/h1-4,9,11-14,20H,5-8,10H2/t11-,12+,13-,14-; Key:UKTAZPQNNNJVKR-YXSUXZIUSA-N

Dolasetron (trade name Anzemet) is a serotonin 5-HT_{3} receptor antagonist used to treat nausea and vomiting following chemotherapy. Its main effect is to reduce the activity of the vagus nerve, which is a nerve that activates the vomiting center in the medulla oblongata. It does not have much antiemetic effect when symptoms are due to motion sickness. This drug does not have any effect on dopamine receptors or muscarinic receptors.

Dolasetron breaks down slowly, staying in the body for a long time. One dose is usually administered once or twice daily and lasts 4 to 9 hours. This drug is removed from the body by the liver and kidneys.

It was patented in 1986 and approved for medical use in 2002. Dolasetron is a therapeutic alternative on the World Health Organization's List of Essential Medicines.

== Medical uses ==
- Chemotherapy-induced nausea and vomiting
  - 5-HT_{3} receptor antagonists are the primary drugs used to treat and prevent chemotherapy-induced nausea and vomiting. Many times they are given intravenously about 30 minutes before beginning therapy.
- Post-operative and post-radiation nausea and vomiting
- Is a possible therapy for nausea and vomiting due to acute or chronic medical illness or acute gastroenteritis
- Unlike most other 5HT3 antagonists, data is lacking for use of dolasetron with aprepitant in chemotherapy-induced nausea and vomiting (CINV).
- It is also sometimes used as an antiemetic (anti-vomiting medication) in veterinary medicine for dogs and cats.

== Adverse effects ==
Dolasetron is a well-tolerated drug with few side effects. Headache, dizziness, and constipation are the most commonly reported side effects associated with its use. There is a potential for prolonging of the QT interval to occur as well. There have been no significant drug interactions reported with this drug's use. Dolasetron is broken down by the liver's cytochrome P450 system and has little effect on the metabolism of other drugs broken down by this system.

Intravenous dolasetron is contraindicated in Chemotherapy-induced nausea and vomiting (CINV). Doxorubicin and cyclophosphamide are as emetogenic as cisplatin, and preventive drugs should always be considered. The 5HT3 agonists are the mainstays of prevention and are frequently used in combination with other drugs such as corticosteroids and the NK1 receptor antagonist aprepitant. However, the US FDA issued a drug communication stating that the injection form of dolasetron, a 5HT3 agonist, should no longer be used in adult or pediatric patients with CINV. Dolasetron injection can increase the risk of developing torsade de pointes, a potentially fatal abnormal heart rhythm. Patients with underlying heart conditions or existing heart rate or rhythm problems are at increased risk. Although the oral form of this agent can still be used, careful monitoring and correction of potassium and magnesium levels should be initiated prior to and during treatment. In addition, in older patients and in patients with heart failure, a slow heart rate, underlying cardiac disease, and those with renal impairment, monitoring with electrocardiography is indicated when this drug is used. Congenital long-QT syndrome and drugs that prolong the PR or QRS interval are contraindications to dolasetron therapy. Dolasetron injection may still be used for the prevention and treatment of postoperative nausea and vomiting, per Food and Drug Administration guidelines.

== See also ==
- 5-HT_{3} receptor antagonist: Drug discovery and development
- Ondansetron
