= 5-HT3 antagonist =

Anti-nausea group of medications

5-HT_{3} receptor antagonist
- Drug class
- Skeletal formula of ondansetron, the prototypical 5-HT_{3} antagonist

Class identifiers
- Use: nausea and vomiting
- ATC code: A04AA
- Biological target: 5-HT_{3} receptor

Clinical data
- Drugs.com: Drug Classes
- Consumer Reports: Best Buy Drugs

External links
- MeSH: D058831

Legal status

The 5-HT_{3} antagonists, informally known as "setrons", are a class of drugs that act as receptor antagonists at the 5-HT_{3} receptor, a subtype of serotonin receptor found in terminals of the vagus nerve and in certain areas of the brain. With the notable exceptions of alosetron and cilansetron, which are used in the treatment of irritable bowel syndrome, all 5-HT_{3} antagonists are antiemetics, used in the prevention and treatment of nausea and vomiting. They are particularly effective in controlling the nausea and vomiting produced by cancer chemotherapy and are considered the gold standard for this purpose.

The 5-HT_{3} antagonists may be identified by the suffix -setron, and are classified under code A04AA of the WHO's Anatomical Therapeutic Chemical Classification System.

== Medical uses ==
5-HT_{3} antagonists are most effective in the prevention and treatment of chemotherapy-induced nausea and vomiting (CINV), especially that caused by highly emetogenic drugs such as cisplatin; when used for this purpose, they may be given alone or, more frequently, with a glucocorticoid, usually dexamethasone. They are usually given intravenously, shortly before administration of the chemotherapeutic agent, although some authors have argued that oral administration may be preferred. The concomitant administration of a NK_{1} receptor antagonist, such as aprepitant, significantly increases the efficacy of 5-HT_{3} antagonists in preventing both acute and delayed CINV.

The 5-HT_{3} antagonists are also indicated in the prevention and treatment of radiation-induced nausea and vomiting (RINV), when needed, and postoperative nausea and vomiting (PONV). Although they are more effective at controlling CINV—where they stop symptoms altogether in up to 70% of people, and reduce them in the remaining 30%—, they are just as effective as other agents for PONV.

Current evidence suggests that 5-HT_{3} antagonists are ineffective in controlling motion sickness. A randomized, placebo-controlled trial of ondansetron to treat motion sickness in air ambulance personnel showed subjective improvement, but it was not statistically significant.

=== Available agents ===
- Ondansetron was the first 5-HT_{3} antagonist, developed by Glaxo around 1984. Its efficacy was first established in 1987, in animal models, and it was extensively studied over the following years. Ondansetron was approved by the U.S. Food and Drug Administration (FDA) in 1991, and has since become available in several other countries, including the UK, Ireland, Australia, Canada, France and Brazil. As of 2008, ondansetron and granisetron are the only 5-HT_{3} antagonists available as a generic drug in the United States. Ondansetron may be given several times daily, depending on the severity of symptoms.
- Tropisetron was also first described in 1984. It is available in several countries, such as the UK, Australia and France, but not in the United States. The effects of tropisetron last up to 24 hours, so it only requires once-daily administration.
- Granisetron was developed around 1988. It is available in the U.S., UK, Australia and other countries. Clinical trials suggest that it is more effective than other 5-HT_{3} antagonists in preventing delayed CINV (nausea and vomiting that occur more than 24 hours after the first dose of chemotherapy). It is taken once daily.
- Dolasetron was first mentioned in the literature in 1989. It is a prodrug, and most of its effects are due to its active metabolite, hydrodolasetron, which is formed in the liver by the enzyme carbonyl reductase. Dolasetron was approved by the FDA in 1997, and is also administered once daily.
- Palonosetron is the newest 5-HT_{3} antagonist to become available in the U.S. market. It is an isoquinoline derivative, and is effective in preventing delayed CINV. Palonosetron was approved by the FDA in 2003, initially for intravenous use. An oral formulation was approved on August 22, 2008, for prevention of acute CINV alone, as a large clinical trial did not show oral administration to be as effective as IV use against delayed CINV.
- Ramosetron is only available in Japan and certain Southeast Asian countries as of 2008. It has higher affinity for the 5-HT_{3} receptor than the older 5-HT_{3} antagonists, and maintains its effects over two days; it is therefore significantly more effective for delayed CINV. In animal studies, ramosetron was also effective against irritable bowel syndrome-like symptoms.

Alosetron and cilansetron—the latter was developed by Solvay but never approved by the FDA—are not antiemetics; instead, they are indicated in the treatment of a subset of irritable bowel syndrome where diarrhea is the dominant symptom. Alosetron was withdrawn from the U.S. market in 2000 due to unacceptably frequent severe side effects, including ischemic colitis, and is only available through a restrictive program to patients who meet certain requirements.

Certain prokinetic drugs such as cisapride, renzapride and metoclopramide, although not 5-HT_{3} antagonists proper, possess some weak antagonist effect at the 5-HT_{3} receptor. Galanolactone, a diterpenoid found in ginger, is a 5-HT_{3} antagonist and is believed to at least partially mediate the anti-emetic activity of this plant. Mirtazapine is a tetracyclic antidepressant with 5-HT_{2} and 5-HT_{3} antagonist effects that also possesses strong anti-emetic properties, however it is also very sedating. Studies show that mirtazapine is as equally effective in treating chemotherapy-related nausea and vomiting as standard treatments; it is also cheaper and has fewer side effects than typical anti-emetics, and its antidepressant qualities may be an added benefit for cancer populations. Mirtazapine has also been used in the treatment of the motility disorder gastroparesis due to its anti-emetic effects. Olanzapine, an atypical antipsychotic with anti-emetic properties similar to those of mirtazapine, also shows promise in treating chemotherapy-induced nausea and vomiting.

== Adverse effects ==
There are few side effects related to the use of 5-HT_{3} antagonists; the most common are constipation or diarrhea, headache, and dizziness. Unlike antihistamines with antiemetic properties such as cyclizine, 5-HT_{3} antagonists do not produce sedation, nor do they cause extrapyramidal effects, as phenothiazines (e.g., prochlorperazine) sometimes do.

All 5-HT_{3} antagonists have been associated with asymptomatic electrocardiogram changes, such as prolongation of the PT and QTc intervals and certain arrhythmias. The clinical significance of these side effects is unknown.

== Pharmacology ==
=== Mechanism of action ===
The 5-HT_{3} receptors are present in several critical sites involved in emesis, including vagal afferents, the solitary tract nucleus (STN), and the area postrema itself. Serotonin is released by the enterochromaffin cells of the small intestine in response to chemotherapeutic agents and may stimulate vagal afferents (via 5-HT_{3} receptors) to initiate the vomiting reflex. The 5-HT_{3} receptor antagonists suppress vomiting and nausea by inhibiting serotonin binding to the 5-HT_{3} receptors. The highest concentration of 5-HT_{3} receptors in the central nervous system (CNS) are found in the STN and chemoreceptor trigger zone (CTZ), and 5-HT_{3} antagonists may also suppress vomiting and nausea by acting at these sites. The 5-HT_{3} antagonists are greatly selective and have little affinity for other receptors, such as dopamine, histamine and muscarinic acetylcholine receptors.

=== Pharmacokinetics ===
All 5-HT_{3} antagonists are well-absorbed and effective after oral administration, and all are metabolized in the liver by various isoenzymes of the cytochrome P450 system. They do not, however, inhibit or induce these enzymes.

=== Comparative pharmacology ===
Despite the 5-HT_{3} receptor antagonists sharing their mechanism of action, they have different chemical structures and exhibit differences in affinity for the receptor, dose response and duration of effect. They are also metabolized in different ways, that is, different components of the cytochrome P450 (CYP) system predominate in the metabolism of the antagonists.

Because of this, patients who are resistant to one antagonist might benefit from another. A correlation exists between the number of active CYP 2D6 alleles and the number of vomiting episodes by patients who receive treatment with cisplatin and ondansetron or tropisetron. Patients with multiple alleles tend to be unresponsive to the antiemetic drug and vice versa.

Comparative pharmacology of 5-HT_{3} receptor antagonist
Drug	Chemical nature	Receptor antagonists	T_{1/2} (h)	Metabolism	Dose
Ondansetron	Carbazole derivative	5-HT_{3} receptor antagonist and weak 5-HT_{4} antagonist	3.9 hours	CYP1A1/2, CYP2D6, CYP 3A3/4/5	150 μg/kg
Granisetron	Indazole	5-HT_{3} receptor antagonist	9–11.6 hours	CYP3A3/4/5	10 μg/kg
Dolasetron	Indole	5-HT_{3} receptor antagonist	7–9 hours	CYP 3A3/4/5, CYP2D6	600 – 3000 μg/kg
Palonosetron	Isoquinoline	5-HT_{3} receptor antagonist; highest affinity for 5-HT_{3} receptor in this class	40 hours	CYP1A2, CYP2D6, CYP3A3/4/5	0.25 mg dose
Ramosetron	Benzimidazole derivative	5-HT_{3} receptor antagonist	5.8 hours		300 μg/kg
Tropisetron	Indole	5-HT_{3} receptor antagonist	5.6 hours	CYP 3A3/4/5, CYP2D6	200 μg/kg
Vortioxetine	Phenylpiperazine	5-HT_{3} receptor antagonist Antidepressant	66 hours	CYP 2D6/ 2A6/CYP2B6/CYP2C8/9, CYP2C19	5 mg, 10 mg, 20 mg doses

== History ==
The history of the 5-HT_{3} receptor antagonists began in 1957, when John Gaddum and Zuleika P. Picarelli at the University of Edinburgh proposed the existence of two serotonin receptor subtypes, the M and D receptors (thus named because their function could be blocked by morphine and dibenzyline respectively). The 5-HT_{3} receptor was later found to correspond to the M receptor. In the 1970s, John Fozard found that metoclopramide and cocaine were weak antagonists at the 5-HT_{3} (5-HT-M) receptor. Fozard and Maurice Gittos later synthesized MDL 72222, the first potent and truly selective 5-HT_{3} receptor antagonist. The antiemetic effects of metoclopramide were found to be partially because of its serotonin antagonism.

While Fozard was investigating cocaine analogues, researchers at Sandoz identified the potent, selective 5-HT_{3} receptor antagonist ICS 205-930 from which the first marketed selective 5-HT_{3} receptor antagonists ondansetron and granisetron were developed, and approved in 1991 and 1993 respectively. Several compounds related to MDL 72222 were synthesized which eventually resulted in approval of tropisetron in 1994 and dolasetron in 1997. A new and improved 5-HT_{3} receptor antagonist, named palonosetron, was approved in 2003. The development of selective 5-HT_{3} receptor antagonists was a dramatic improvement in the treatment of nausea and vomiting. Ondansetron, granisetron, dolasetron and palonosetron are currently approved in the United States, and form the cornerstone of therapy for the control of acute emesis with chemotherapy agents with moderate to high emetogenic potential.

=== Development ===
5-HT_{3} receptor antagonists or serotonin antagonists were first introduced in the early 1990s, and they have become the most widely used antiemetic drugs in chemotherapy. They have also been proven safe and effective for treatment of postoperative nausea and vomiting. Serotonin (5-HT) is found widely distributed throughout the gut and the central nervous system. In the gut, 5-HT is found mostly in mucosal enterochromaffin cells. Enterochromaffin cells are sensory transducers that release 5-HT to activate intrinsic (via 5-HT_{1P} and 5-HT_{4} receptors) and extrinsic (via 5-HT_{3} receptors) primary afferent nerves. Chemotherapeutic drugs for malignant disorders that cause vomiting have been found to cause release of large amounts of serotonin from enterochromaffin cells in the gut, serotonin acts on 5-HT_{3} receptors in the gut and brain stem.

== Drug design ==
Experiments have shown evidence that the ligand-binding site is located at the interface of two adjacent subunits. The ligand binding site is formed by three loops (A-C) from the principal ligand binding subunit (principal face) and three β-strands (D-F) from the adjacent subunit (complementary face). The amino acid residue E129 on loop A faces into the binding pocket and forms a critical hydrogen bond with the hydroxyl group of 5-HT. Loop B contains W183, a critical tryptophan ligand binding residue that contributes to a cation-π interaction between the pi electron density of tryptophan and the primary amine of 5-HT. Loop C residues have been considered as candidates for the differing pharmacology of rodent and human 5-HT_{3} receptors because of their divergence between species. The most important aromatic residue within loop C is probably Y234 that lies opposite to the loop B tryptophan in the ligand binding pocket and is involved in ligand binding. Loops D and F are in fact β-strands not loops. W90 in loop D is critical for ligand binding and antagonists may directly contact R92. The azabicyclic ring of the competitive antagonist granisetron is located close to W183 forming a cation-pi interaction. Loop E residues Y143, G148, E149, V150, Q151, N152, Y153 and K154 may be important for granisetron binding. The structure of loop F has yet to be clarified but W195 and D204 seem to be critical for ligand binding.

Binding affinity of 5-HT_{3} receptor antagonist
5-HT_{3} receptor antagonists	Binding affinity (K_{d}, K_{i}, K_{50})	Species
Tropisetron	11 nM	Human
Granisetron	1.44 nM	Human
Ondansetron	4.9 nM	Human
Palonosetron	31.6 nM	Rat cerebral cortex, rabbit ileal myenteric plexus, guinea-pig ileal plexus
Dolasetron	20.03 nM	NG 108-15
Metoclopramide (non-selective)	355 nM	Human
Cocaine	2.45–83 nM	Rat-rabbit

=== Pharmacophore scaffold ===
Fig 1. Ondansetron: First generation 5-HT_{3} receptor antagonist

Fig 2. Palonosetron: Second generation 5-HT_{3} receptor antagonist

Chemical structures of the first generation 5-HT_{3} receptor antagonist can be categorized to three main classes

1. Carbazole derivatives (ondansetron)
2. Indazoles (granisetron)
3. Indoles (tropisetron and dolasetron)

The first-generation 5-HT_{3} receptor antagonist (ondansetron, dolasetron, granisetron, and tropisetron) have been the most important drugs in antiemetic therapy for emetogenic chemotherapy. They are especially effective in treating acute emesis, occurring in the first 24 hours following chemotherapy. A newer drug palonosetron is a pharmacologically distinct and highly selective, second generation 5-HT_{3} receptor antagonist. Palonosetron has two stereogenic centers and exists as four stereoisomers. Palonosetron has longer half-life (40h) and greater receptor binding affinity (>30 fold; when compared to first generation antagonists).

=== Pharmacophore ===
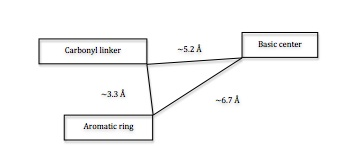
Fig 3. The 5-HT_{3} receptor antagonists pharmacophore (schematic)

The pharmacophore of 5-HT_{3}receptors consists of three components: a carbonyl-containing linking moiety, aromatic/heteroaromatic ring, and a basic center. The carbonyl group is coplanar to the aromatic ring. 5-HT_{3} receptor antagonists are more likely to bind in their protonated form. Docking of a range of antagonists into a homology model of the 5-HT_{3} receptor binding site shows a reasonably good agreement with the pharmacophore model and supports the observed differences between species. Studies of granisetron in the binding pocket revealed that the aromatic rings of granisetron lie between W183 and Y234 and the azabicyclic ring between W90 and F226. In this study another energetically favorable location of granisetron was identified, closer to the membrane, on a position that could be a part of a binding/unbinding pathway for the ligand. A similarly located alternative binding site for granisetron has since been identified in another study of the 5-HT_{3} receptor.

=== Structure-activity relationship ===
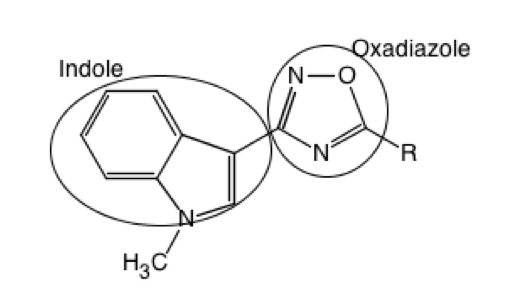
Fig 4. The main pharmacophoric elements of the known 5-HT_{3} antagonist

5-HT_{3} receptor antagonists share the same pharmacophore. An aromatic moiety (preferably indole), a linking acyl group capable of hydrogen bonding interactions, and a basic amine (nitrogen) can be regarded as the key pharmacophoric elements of the known 5-HT_{3}receptor antagonists. There are steric limitations of the aromatic binding site and although two hydrogen-bonding interactions are possible on the heterocyclic linking group (oxadiazole capable of accepting two hydrogen bonds), only one is essential for high affinity. An optimal environment of the basic nitrogen is when its constrained within an azabicyclic system with the highest affinity observed for systems with nitrogen at the bridgehead position and secondary amines being more potent. The 5-HT3 receptor can only accommodate small substituents on the charged amine, a methyl group being optimal. The optimal distance between the aromatic binding site and the basic amine is 8,4-8,9 Å and it is best if a two-carbon linkage separates the oxadiazole and the nitrogen. An increasing substitution of R increases affinity. The most potent antagonists of 5-HT_{3} receptors have a 6-membered aromatic ring, and they usually have 6,5 heterocyclic rings. No correlation has been found between the lipophilicity of compounds and the 5-HT_{3} receptor affinities. Since most of the known 5-HT3 antagonists are ester or amide derivatives they are potentially susceptible to hydrolysis, which could be avoided by incorporating H-bond acceptors within a 5-membered heteroaromatic ring.

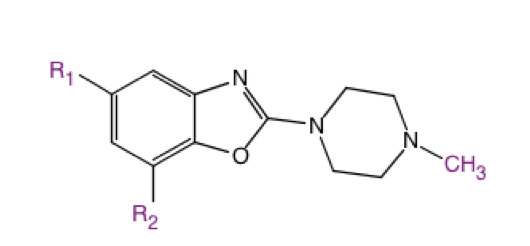
Fig 5. The importance of C5 (R1) and C7 (R2) substitution has been studied

Structure-activity relationship (SAR) studies of LGIC receptor ligands are valuable to investigate their structure and function. An antagonist-like molecule with low intrinsic activity (ia) decreases the frequency of channel-opening and the permeability of ions. Small lipophilic C5 (R1) (see fig. 5) substituents afford compounds with potent antagonism which indicates that the C5 substituent may fit in a narrow, hydrophobic groove of the binding region in the receptor. It seems that the amino acid residues that interact with the C7 (R2) substituents have little to do with ligand binding but play a big role in ion channel gating. Sterically bulky substituents show a greater interaction with the gating amino acid residues and favor the open conformation of the ion channel because of sterical repulsion.

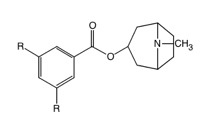
Fig 6. The carbonyl group is completely coplanar with the adjacent aromatic ring

Ondansetron is a racemate but the stereochemistry of the asymmetric carbon atom is not an important factor in the 5-HT_{3} receptor interaction. Annelation of the 1,7-positions of the indole nucleus of ondansetron results in increased affinity for the receptor.

A methyl- group appears to be as effective functionally as a chlorine in the R position (see fig. 6). The carbonyl group is responsible for a strong interaction with the receptor and contributes significantly to the binding process. This carbonyl group is completely coplanar with the adjacent aromatic ring, indicating that the receptor-bound conformation corresponds to one of the most stable conformations of this group in the flexible compounds.

== Research ==
A small, open-label trial carried out in 2000 found ondansetron to be useful in treating antipsychotic-induced tardive dyskinesia in people with schizophrenia. The study's patients also showed significant improvement in the disease's symptoms; a later double-blind, randomized controlled trial also found ondansetron to significantly improve schizophrenia symptoms when used as an adjunct to haloperidol, and people taking both drugs experienced fewer of the adverse effects commonly associated with haloperidol.

== See also ==
- Atypical antipsychotic (another drug class that often antagonizes the same receptor)
- Serotonin transporter
