= C19H27N3O =

The molecular formula C_{19}H_{27}N_{3}O (molar mass: 313.437 g/mol, exact mass: 313.2154 u) may refer to:

- MEPIRAPIM
- NDTDI
- Ricasetron (BRL-46470)
