= Yoshitaka Fujii =

Japanese anesthesiologist accused of scientific misconduct

- Born: 19 April 1960 (age 66)
- Education: Tokai University; Tokyo Medical and Dental University
- Known for: Falsifying scientific data
- Scientific career
- Fields: Anesthesiology
- Workplaces: Tokyo Medical and Dental University; University of Tsukuba; Toho University

Yoshitaka Fujii (藤井 善隆, Fujii Yoshitaka) is a Japanese researcher in anesthesiology, who in 2012 was found to have fabricated data in at least 219 scientific papers, of which 183 have been retracted.

== Summary of professional career ==
Fujii graduated from Tokai University School of Medicine in 1987 and holds an M.D. degree. He attended the Graduate School of Medical and Dental Sciences, Tokyo Medical and Dental University, where he majored in anesthesiology and received his Ph.D. in 1991. During his career, he worked at institutions including Tokyo Medical and Dental University, the University of Tsukuba, and Toho University. According to an online CV, he spent two years in Canada as a research fellow at Royal Victoria Hospital, McGill University, before assuming a faculty position at the University of Tsukuba Institute of Clinical Medicine in 1997. He joined the faculty of Toho University in 2005. Most of his research publications were based around clinical trials of various medications intended to treat the nausea and vomiting that often occur after surgery.

In February 2012, after initial investigations into allegations of scientific misconduct, he was dismissed from his position as associate professor of anesthesiology in the Toho University Faculty of Medicine.

== Research misconduct ==
Fujii apparently began publishing falsified data in 1993. The first published allegations of research fraud by Fujii appeared in 2000 in a letter to the editor of the journal Anesthesia & Analgesia by Peter Kranke, Christian Apfel, and others. The letter questioned Fujii's reported findings regarding the effectiveness of granisetron in controlling post-surgical nausea and vomiting, characterizing the data reported in 47 papers as "incredibly nice" and stating "we became skeptical when we realized that side effects were almost always identical in all groups". A paper published by the same group in 2001 in Acta Anaesthesiologica Scandinavica reported "consistent discrepancies" between Fujii's data and other researchers' findings on the efficacy of granisetron. Fujii dismissed the criticisms of his work, insisting that his results were "true" and asking "How much evidence is required to provide adequate proof?" Apfel wrote to the U.S. Food and Drug Administration, the Japanese Pharmaceuticals and Medical Devices Agency, and the Japanese Society of Anesthesiologists to alert them to the possible unreliability of Fujii's results, but did not receive any response. No institutional review of Fujii's research was requested and journals continued to accept new papers submitted by Fujii. The editors of Anesthesia & Analgesia did not follow up on the fraud allegations against Fujii until about 2010, when its editor and the editors of several other journals began a coordinated investigation into the integrity of Fujii's scientific publications after the editor of the journal Anaesthesia voiced new concerns. In March 2012, the editor of Anesthesia & Analgesia acknowledged that the journal's response to the allegations made in 2000 had been "inadequate".

Two analyses of some of Fujii's publications were released in March 2012. On 7 March, Toho University reported finding that although nine of Fujii's publications were about clinical studies described as having been conducted at Ushiku Aiwa General Hospital, the hospital's ethics committee had given Fujii approval for only one study. Following this discovery, eight of the nine papers were retracted for failure to follow established ethical standards for clinical research. On 8 March, Anaesthesia published a report by John Carlisle, a consultant anesthetist in the United Kingdom, on his statistical analysis of the data reported in 168 papers by Fujii. Carlisle used statistical methods to evaluate whether the published distributions of various variables were consistent with the distributions that could be expected to result from random chance. He found that many of the data sets were "extremely unlikely to have arisen by chance", noting that many of the distributions had "likelihoods that are infinitesimally small", citing a calculated probability of 6.78 × 10^{−9}, or about 1 in 150 million. Accordingly, he recommended that data published by Fujii should be "excluded from meta-analyses or reviews" until such time that the unlikely results could be satisfactorily explained.

In April, the editors of 23 scientific journals made a public request for an investigation of Fujii's research by the seven Japanese institutions named as affiliations in his published papers. A committee of the Japanese Society of Anesthesiologists, headed by Koji Sumikawa of Nagasaki University, undertook an examination of 212 of the 249 papers credited to Fujii. The committee interviewed Fujii's listed co-authors and other people who had been involved with Fujii's research. Committee members also attempted to obtain and review laboratory notebooks, patient records, and other raw data from his studies. On 29 June 2012, the committee reported finding that a total of 172 papers contained fabricated data. Of these, 126 papers were determined to have been "totally fabricated". The report stated: "It is as if someone sat at a desk and wrote a novel about a research idea." The committee found that three of the 212 papers were valid. For 37 of the 212 papers, the committee was unable to determine whether data had been fabricated.

The investigators observed that Fujii seemed to have been deliberately ambiguous about details such as the dates of the studies and the names of the institutions where they were conducted, apparently to reduce the possibility that his fraud would be detected. Also, by listing co-authors from institutions other than his current employer, he conveyed the impression that the papers described studies done at multiple hospitals. Several scientists listed as co-authors were not aware that Fujii had included their names on his papers; two named co-authors said that their signatures had been forged on a cover letter submitting the paper to the journal. Retraction Watch suggested that the supposed co-authors might not have been aware that their names had been misused because the papers had received few citations. Investigators found that one of Fujii's co-authors, Hidenori Toyooka, who collaborated with Fujii on "dozens" of papers, may have been aware of the deception.

As of 2025, 172 of Fujii's research publications have been retracted. According to Retraction Watch, Fujii has the second most retractions of scientific papers by a single author. He was at the top of Retraction Watch's leaderboard until July 2023, when he was surpassed by German anesthesiologist Joachim Boldt.

== See also ==
- List of scientific misconduct incidents
