= Glucose/fructose/phosphoric acid =

Combination drug

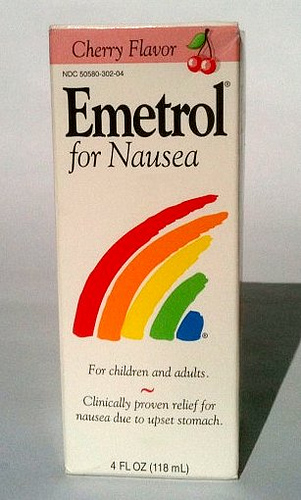

Combination of
- Glucose: Monosaccharide
- Fructose: Monosaccharide
- Phosphoric acid: Acid

Clinical data
- Trade names: Emetrol
- AHFS/Drugs.com: Consumer Drug Information
- Routes of administration: Oral

Legal status
- Legal status: US: OTC

Identifiers
- CAS Number: 8052-37-7
- ChemSpider: none

Glucose/fructose/phosphoric acid (trade name Emetrol) is an over-the-counter antiemetic taken to relieve nausea and vomiting. Made by WellSpring Pharmaceutical Corporation, it was formerly distributed by McNeil Consumer Healthcare.

== History ==
Emetrol was created by Kinney and Company of Columbus, Indiana and was first used in 1949.

It is a phosphorated carbohydrate solution, and comes in syrup form.

== Contraindications ==
Since Emetrol contains fructose it is contraindicated for people with hereditary fructose intolerance (HFI). In diabetes patients, it can cause potentially harmful hyperglycaemia (high blood sugar).
