= Pseudotropine acyltransferase =

Enzyme

Identifiers
- EC no.: 2.3.1.186
- CAS no.: 162535-26-4&title= 138440-78-5, 162535-26-4

Databases
- IntEnz: IntEnz view
- BRENDA: BRENDA entry
- ExPASy: NiceZyme view
- KEGG: KEGG entry
- MetaCyc: metabolic pathway
- PRIAM: profile
- PDB structures: RCSB PDB PDBe PDBsum
Search
- PMC: articles
- PubMed: articles
- NCBI: proteins

Pseudotropine acyltransferase (EC 2.3.1.186, pseudotropine:acyl-CoA transferase, tigloyl-CoA:pseudotropine acyltransferase, acetyl-CoA:pseudotropine acyltransferase, pseudotropine acetyltransferase, pseudotropine tigloyltransferase, PAT) is an enzyme with systematic name acyl-CoA:pseudotropine O-acyltransferase. This enzyme catalyses the following chemical reaction

acyl-CoA + pseudotropine $\rightleftharpoons$ CoA + O-acylpseudotropine

This enzyme exhibits absolute specificity for the exo/3beta configuration found in pseudotropine as tropine (tropan-3alpha-ol).
