= Acridine carboxamide =

Chemical compound

Identifiers
- IUPAC name: N-[2-(Dimethylamino)ethyl]-4-acridinecarboxamide
- CAS Number: 89459-25-6
- PubChem CID: 107805
- ChemSpider: 96954
- UNII: 0N3V8R4E13
- CompTox Dashboard (EPA): DTXSID60237739

Chemical and physical data
- Formula: C_{18}H_{19}N_{3}O
- Molar mass: 293.370 g·mol^{−1}
- 3D model (JSmol): Interactive image
- SMILES: CN(C)CCNC(=O)C1=CC=CC2=CC3=CC=CC=C3N=C21
- InChI: InChI=1S/C18H19N3O/c1-21(2)11-10-19-18(22)15-8-5-7-14-12-13-6-3-4-9-16(13)20-17(14)15/h3-9,12H,10-11H2,1-2H3,(H,19,22); Key:XBGNERSKEKDZDS-UHFFFAOYSA-N

Acridine carboxamide is a chemotherapy agent that is being studied in the treatment of cancer. It belongs to the family of drugs called topoisomerase inhibitors.

While the agent was well tolerated in Phase II clinical trials, it did not show efficacy when tested against various types of cancers.

== See also ==
- Ondansetron, an isomer of Acridine carboxamide
