= Oxetorone =

Chemical compound

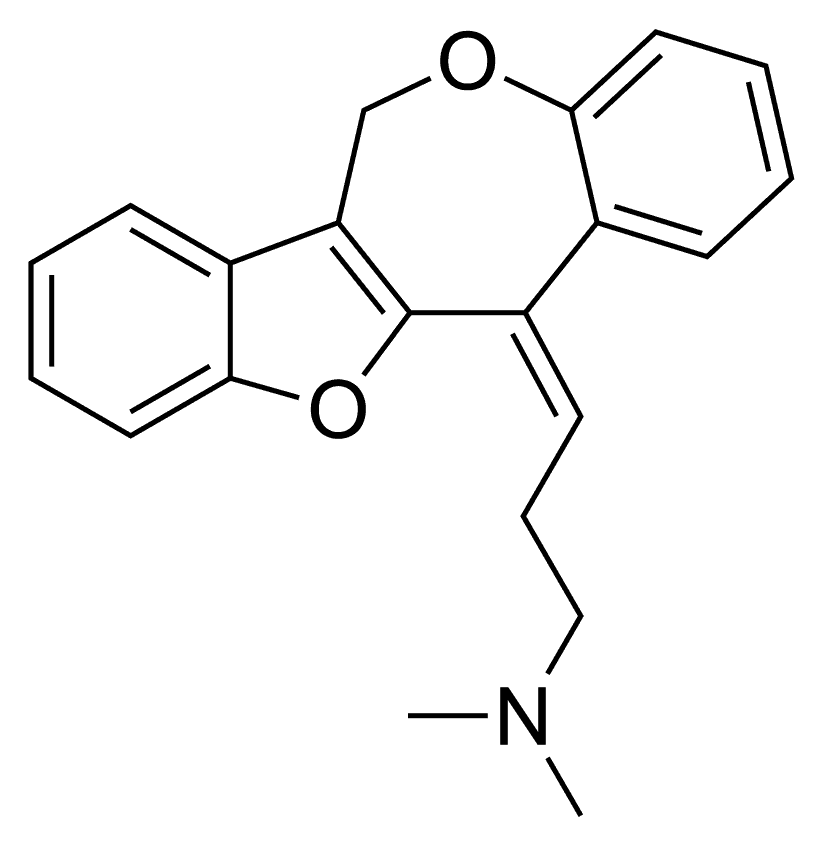

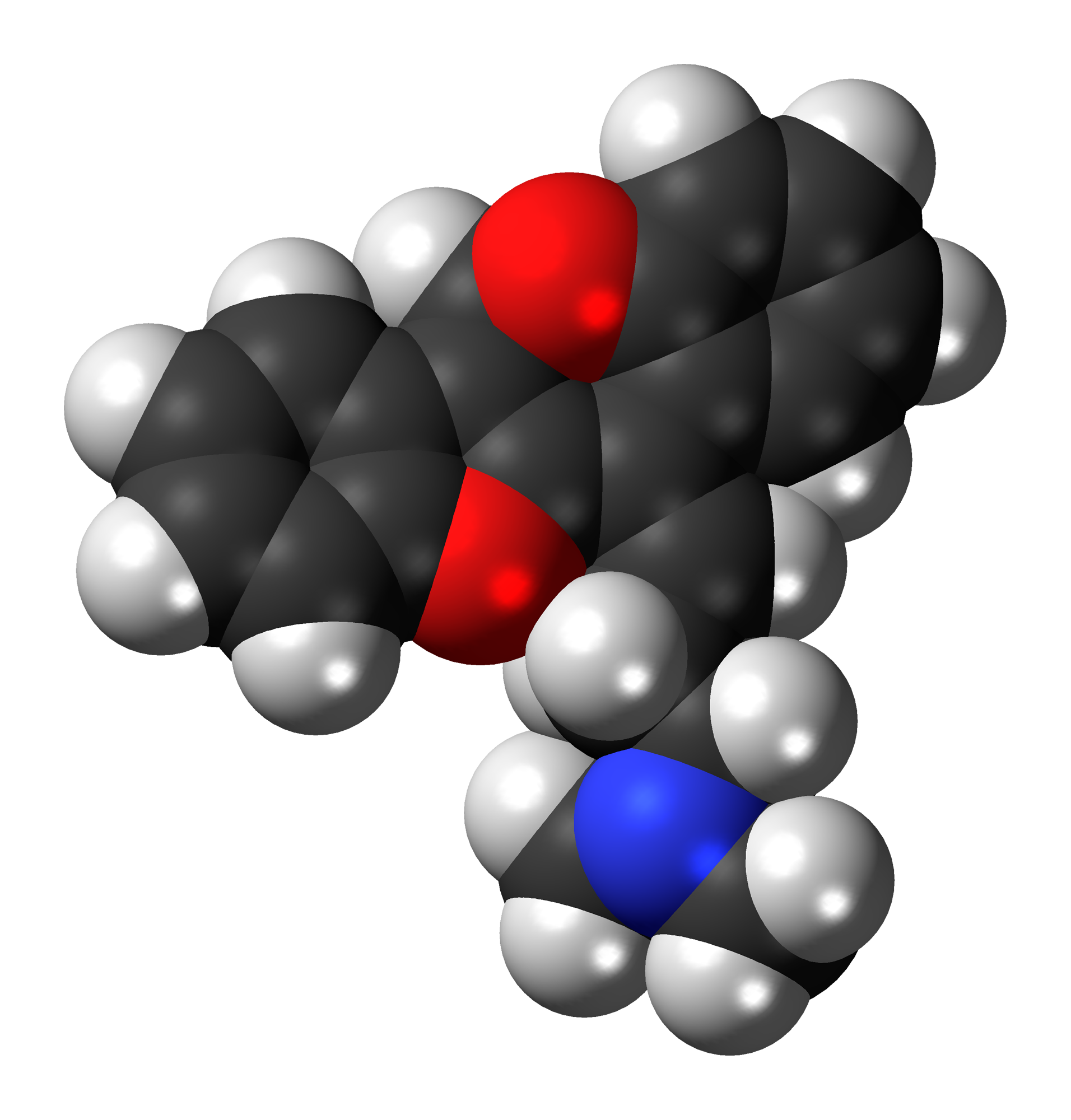

Clinical data
- AHFS/Drugs.com: International Drug Names
- ATC code: N02CX06 (WHO)

Identifiers
- IUPAC name: (3Z)-3-[1]benzofuro[3,2-c][1]benzoxepin-6(12H)-ylidene-N,N-dimethylpropan-1-amine
- CAS Number: 26020-55-3
- PubChem CID: 6436540
- ChemSpider: 21173074
- UNII: T3XOS33TIQ
- KEGG: D08312
- CompTox Dashboard (EPA): DTXSID50865262
- ECHA InfoCard: 100.043.086

Chemical and physical data
- Formula: C_{21}H_{21}NO_{2}
- Molar mass: 319.404 g·mol^{−1}
- 3D model (JSmol): Interactive image
- SMILES: CN(C)CCC=C1C2=CC=CC=C2OCC3=C1OC4=CC=CC=C34
- InChI: InChI=1S/C21H21NO2/c1-22(2)13-7-10-17-15-8-3-5-11-19(15)23-14-18-16-9-4-6-12-20(16)24-21(17)18/h3-6,8-12H,7,13-14H2,1-2H3; Key:VZVRZTZPHOHSCK-UHFFFAOYSA-N

Oxetorone (INN), as oxetorone fumarate (USAN) (brand names Nocertone, Oxedix), is a serotonin antagonist, antihistamine, and alpha blocker used as an antimigraine drug. Association with hyperprolactinemia has been described and antidopaminergic actions are also suspected.
