= Ramosetron =

Chemical compound

Clinical data
- AHFS/Drugs.com: International Drug Names
- Routes of administration: By mouth (ODT), IV
- ATC code: None

Pharmacokinetic data
- Elimination half-life: 5.8 hours

Identifiers
- IUPAC name: (1-Methyl-1H-indol-3-yl)[(5R)-4,5,6,7-tetrahydro-1H-benzimidazol-5-yl]methanone
- CAS Number: 132036-88-5; HCl: 132907-72-3
- PubChem CID: 108000
- IUPHAR/BPS: 2301; HCl: 2305
- ChemSpider: 97112
- UNII: 7ZRO0SC54Y; HCl: 9551LHD87E
- KEGG: D02016
- ChEMBL: ChEMBL1643895
- CompTox Dashboard (EPA): DTXSID0043842

Chemical and physical data
- Formula: C_{17}H_{17}N_{3}O
- Molar mass: 279.343 g·mol^{−1}
- 3D model (JSmol): Interactive image
- SMILES: CN1C=C(C2=CC=CC=C21)C(=O)[C@@H]3CCC4=C(C3)NC=N4
- InChI: InChI=1S/C17H17N3O/c1-20-9-13(12-4-2-3-5-16(12)20)17(21)11-6-7-14-15(8-11)19-10-18-14/h2-5,9-11H,6-8H2,1H3,(H,18,19)/t11-/m1/s1; Key:NTHPAPBPFQJABD-LLVKDONJSA-N

Ramosetron (INN) is a serotonin 5-HT_{3} receptor antagonist for the treatment of nausea and vomiting. Ramosetron is also indicated for a treatment of "diarrhea-predominant irritable bowel syndrome in male and women". In India it is marketed under the brand name of Ibset.

It is only licensed for use in Japan and selected Southeast Asian countries. In Japan it is sold under the trade name Irribow. and in India as Ibset . 'Elsewhere it is commonly sold under the trade name Nasea and in India as Nozia (150 μg/mL injection & 100 μg oral tablet).
