= 3,3-Diethyl-2-pyrrolidinone =

Chemical compound

Clinical data
- ATC code: none

Identifiers
- IUPAC name: 3,3-Diethylpyrrolidin-2-one
- CAS Number: 175698-05-2
- PubChem CID: 9793807
- ChemSpider: 7969574
- UNII: YW6BG9J9SK
- ChEBI: CHEBI:180486
- ChEMBL: ChEMBL293075
- CompTox Dashboard (EPA): DTXSID60430723
- ECHA InfoCard: 100.162.031

Chemical and physical data
- Formula: C_{8}H_{15}NO
- Molar mass: 141.214 g·mol^{−1}
- 3D model (JSmol): Interactive image
- SMILES: CCC1(CC)CCNC1=O
- InChI: InChI=1S/C8H15NO/c1-3-8(4-2)5-6-9-7(8)10/h3-6H2,1-2H3,(H,9,10); Key:WYPUMACPRYGQOM-UHFFFAOYSA-N

3,3-Diethyl-2-pyrrolidinone (DEABL) is an anticonvulsant drug most closely related to pyrithyldione and gabapentin. It was found to extend lifespan in the nematode worms Caenorhabditis elegans.
