= Tropine =

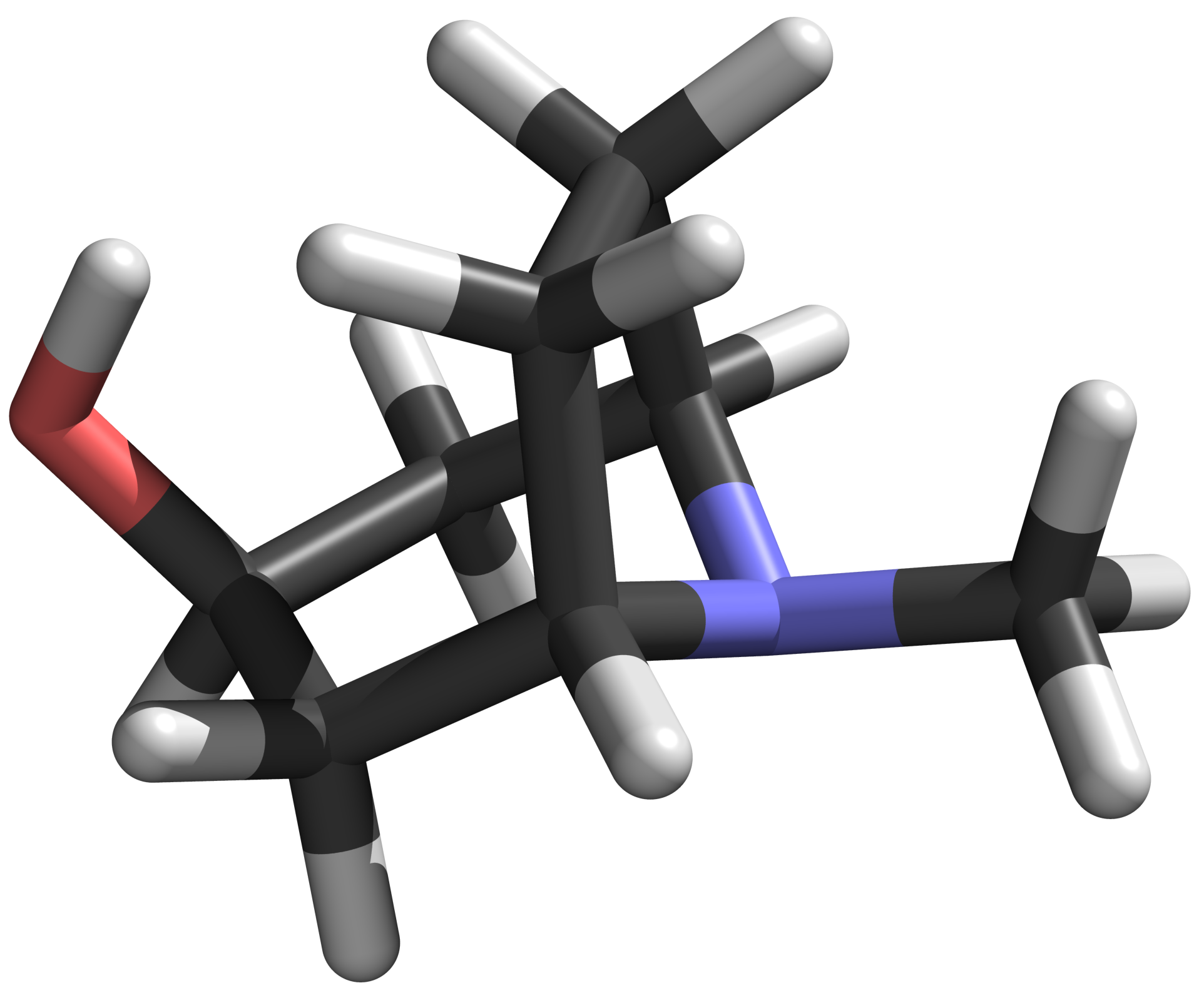

Names
- Preferred IUPAC name (1R,3r,5S)-8-Methyl-8-azabicyclo[3.2.1]octan-3-ol
- Other names α-Tropine; Tropanol; 3-Tropanol

Identifiers
| CAS Number | 120-29-6 |
| 3D model (JSmol) | Interactive image |
| ChemSpider | 10180559 |
| ECHA InfoCard | 100.003.986 |
| MeSH | Tropine |
| PubChem CID | 8424 |
| UNII | 7YXR19M72Y |
| CompTox Dashboard (EPA) | DTXSID2049399 |
- InChI: InChI=1S/C8H15NO/c1-9-6-2-3-7(9)5-8(10)4-6/h6-8,10H,2-5H2,1H3/t6-,7+,8+ Key: CYHOMWAPJJPNMW-JIGDXULJSA-N; InChI=1/C8H15NO/c1-9-6-2-3-7(9)5-8(10)4-6/h6-8,10H,2-5H2,1H3/t6-,7+,8+ Key: CYHOMWAPJJPNMW-JIGDXULJBD
- SMILES: CN1[C@@H]2CC[C@H]1C[C@H](C2)O

Properties
| Chemical formula | C_{8}H_{15}NO |
| Molar mass | 141.214 g·mol^{−1} |
| Appearance | White hygroscopic crystalline powder or plates |
| Odor | Amine-like |
| Density | 1.045 g/cm^{3} at 25 °C; 1.016 g/cm^{3} at 100 °C |
| Melting point | 64 °C (147 °F; 337 K) |
| Boiling point | 233 °C (451 °F; 506 K) |
| Solubility | Very soluble in water, diethyl ether, ethanol |

Hazards
- Occupational safety and health (OHS/OSH)
| Main hazards | Toxic |
- GHS labelling
| Pictograms | (GHS06: Toxic) (GHS07: Exclamation mark) |
| Signal word | Danger |
| Hazard statements | H301, H302, H312, H332 |
| Precautionary statements | P261, P264, P270, P271, P280, P301+P316, P301+P317, P302+P352, P304+P340, P317, P321, P330, P362+P364, P405, P501 |
- Lethal dose or concentration (LD, LC)
| LD_{50} (median dose) | >2000 mg/kg (rat, oral); 139 mg/kg (mouse, intraperitoneal); >50 mg/kg (rabbit, intravenous); 280 mg/kg (mouse, intraperitoneal); >50 mg/kg (rabbit, intravenous) |
- Except where otherwise noted, data are given for materials in their standard state (at 25 °C [77 °F], 100 kPa). verify (what is ?) Infobox references

Tropine is a derivative of tropane containing a hydroxyl group at the third carbon. It is also called 3-tropanol. It is a poisonous white hygroscopic crystalline powder. It is a heterocyclic alcohol and an amine.

Tropine is a central building block of many chemicals active in the nervous system, including tropane alkaloids. Some of these compounds, such as long-acting muscarinic antagonists are used as medicines because of these effects.

== Occurrence ==
Tropine is a natural product found in the plants of deadly nightshade (Atropa belladonna) and devil's trumpet (Datura stramonium).

== Chemistry ==
=== Synthesis ===
It can be prepared by hydrolysis of atropine or other solanaceous alkaloids.

In the laboratory it is made by the reduction of tropinone

== Derivatives ==
List of derivatives that can be made from tropine:

1. AHN 1-055 HCl: [202646-03-5] Patent: Selfsame as JHW-007 (N-butyl group). This benzhydrol aromatic entity is the same as for flunamine & vanoxerine.
2. Atropine
3. Atromepine
4. Benztropine
5. Bemesetron
6. Butropium bromide (Coliopan®)
7. Ciclotropium (wrong stereochemistry if employing this method)
8. Clobenztropine
9. D-13264 (atropine quat).
10. Decitropine [1242-69-9]
11. Deptropine
12. Fentonium
13. Flutropium bromide (wrong stereoisomer using this method of synthesis).
14. Homatropine
15. PG-9 [156143-26-9] Maleate salt: [155649-00-6] Synthesis: Pharmacol:
16. Methoxytropacin HCl: [74051-44-8]
17. Prampine [7009-65-6]
18. Pudafensine (by Mitsunobu inversion chemistry)
19. SM-21 (other codenames covered too)
20. SM-25 is the ester between tropine and clofibric acid.
21. Tropabazate
22. Tropacine
23. Tropacocaine (by Mitsunobu inversion chemistry)
24. Tropanserin
25. Tropatepine
26. Tropine benzilate ("BAT")
27. Tropirine
28. Tropodifene
29. Xenytropium
30. Zepastine
31. 3-Perfluorophenoxytropane (PC14575207)
32. PC46905316 (Ibuprofen) &PC16115711 (Naproxen).
33. Tropine p-chlorophenoxyacetate [6658-61-3] (c.f. Meclofenoxate).

== See also ==
- Atropine
- Pseudotropine
- Scopine
- Tropane alkaloid
- Tropinone
