= Cilansetron =

Chemical compound

Clinical data
- Other names: Calmactin; KC 9946
- Pregnancy category: C
- Routes of administration: Oral
- ATC code: A03AE03 (WHO)

Legal status
- Legal status: Unlicensed

Pharmacokinetic data
- Bioavailability: 87%
- Metabolism: Hepatic
- Elimination half-life: 1.6 - 1.9 hours
- Excretion: Renal

Identifiers
- IUPAC name: (10R)-10-[(2-Methyl-1H-imidazol-1-yl)methyl]-5,6,9,10-tetrahydro-4H-pyrido(3,2,1-jk)carbazol-11-one
- CAS Number: 120635-74-7
- PubChem CID: 6918107
- IUPHAR/BPS: 2297
- ChemSpider: 5293321
- UNII: 2J6DQ1U5B5
- KEGG: D03495
- ChEMBL: ChEMBL2103778
- CompTox Dashboard (EPA): DTXSID40152951

Chemical and physical data
- Formula: C_{20}H_{21}N_{3}O
- Molar mass: 319.408 g·mol^{−1}
- 3D model (JSmol): Interactive image
- SMILES: O=C3c2c1cccc5c1n(c2CC[C@@H]3Cn4ccnc4C)CCC5
- InChI: InChI=1S/C20H21N3O/c1-13-21-9-11-22(13)12-15-7-8-17-18(20(15)24)16-6-2-4-14-5-3-10-23(17)19(14)16/h2,4,6,9,11,15H,3,5,7-8,10,12H2,1H3/t15-/m1/s1; Key:NCNFDKWULDWJDS-OAHLLOKOSA-N

Cilansetron is an experimental drug that is a 5-HT_{3} antagonist under development by Solvay Pharmaceuticals.

5-HT_{3} receptors are responsible for causing many things from nausea to excess bowel movements. In conditions such as irritable bowel syndrome (IBS), the receptors have become faulty or oversensitive. 5-HT_{3} antagonists work by blocking the nervous and chemical signals from reaching these receptors.

Studies have shown that the drug can improve quality of life in men and women with diarrhea-predominant IBS. Cilansetron is the first 5-HT antagonist specifically designed for IBS that is effective in men as well as women.

In 2005, Solvay received response from the U.S. Food and Drug Administration that cilansertron is not approvable without additional clinical trials; further development has been discontinued.
