= Galanolactone =

- Galanolactone

Names
- Preferred IUPAC name (3E)-3-{2-[(1R,2S,4aS,8aS)-5,5,8a-Trimethyloctahydro-1H-spiro[naphthalene-2,2′-oxiran]-1-yl]ethylidene}oxolan-2-one

Identifiers
CAS Number	115753-79-2
3D model (JSmol)	Interactive image
ChemSpider	9316811
MeSH	galanolactone
PubChem CID	11141699
UNII	4FX4852TYQ
- InChI: InChI=1S/C20H30O3/c1-18(2)9-4-10-19(3)15(18)7-11-20(13-23-20)16(19)6-5-14-8-12-22-17(14)21/h5,15-16H,4,6-13H2,1-3H3/b14-5+/t15-,16+,19-,20+/m0/s1 Key: MBPTXJNHCBXMBP-SDIIOJARSA-N
- SMILES: O=C/1OCCC\1=C\C[C@@H]4[C@@]2([C@H](C(CCC2)(C)C)CC[C@]43OC3)C

Properties
Chemical formula	C_{20}H_{30}O_{3}
Molar mass	318.45 g/mol
Solubility in acetone	Soluble
- Except where otherwise noted, data are given for materials in their standard state (at 25 °C [77 °F], 100 kPa). verify (what is ?) Infobox references

Galanolactone is a diterpenoid lactone first isolated from ginger. It is present in acetone extracts of ginger root, and appears to be an antagonist at 5-HT_{3} receptors.
