= Pseudotropine =

Chemical compound

Clinical data
- Other names: 3β-Tropanol; 1αH,5αH-Tropan-3β-ol

Identifiers
- IUPAC name: (1R,3R,5S)-8-Methyl-8-azabicyclo[3.2.1]octan-3-ol
- CAS Number: 135-97-7
- PubChem CID: 449293
- UNII: L9Q7Z9D09L
- ChEBI: CHEBI:15742
- ChEMBL: ChEMBL1235490
- CompTox Dashboard (EPA): DTXSID501026533
- ECHA InfoCard: 100.004.751

Chemical and physical data
- Formula: C_{8}H_{15}NO
- Molar mass: 141.214 g·mol^{−1}
- 3D model (JSmol): Interactive image
- SMILES: CN1[C@@H]2CC[C@H]1C[C@@H](C2)O
- InChI: InChI=1S/C8H15NO/c1-9-6-2-3-7(9)5-8(10)4-6/h6-8,10H,2-5H2,1H3/t6-,7+,8-; Key:CYHOMWAPJJPNMW-RNLVFQAGSA-N

Pseudotropine (3β-tropanol, ψ-tropine, 3-pseudotropanol, or PTO) is a derivative of tropane and an isomer of tropine. Pseudotropine can be found in the Coca plant along with several other alkaloids

== Synthesis ==
In the laboratory it is made by the reduction of tropinone: According to the article, good stereoselectivity of pseudotropine over endotropine could be achieved when employing a Meerwein–Ponndorf–Verley reduction or sodium metal in n-pentanol.

== Derivatives ==
- Pudafensine
- Tropigline (Tigloidine, ticloidine) [533-08-4] (E)-form Produced by Physalis peruviana. Anticholinergic, anti parkinsonian drug.
- Convolamine
- Valtropine
- Pseudotropine benzoate (tropacocaine)

== See also ==
- Pseudotropine acyltransferase
- Atropine
- Tropine
- Tropinone
