= Granisetron =

Serotonin 5-HT3 antiemetic

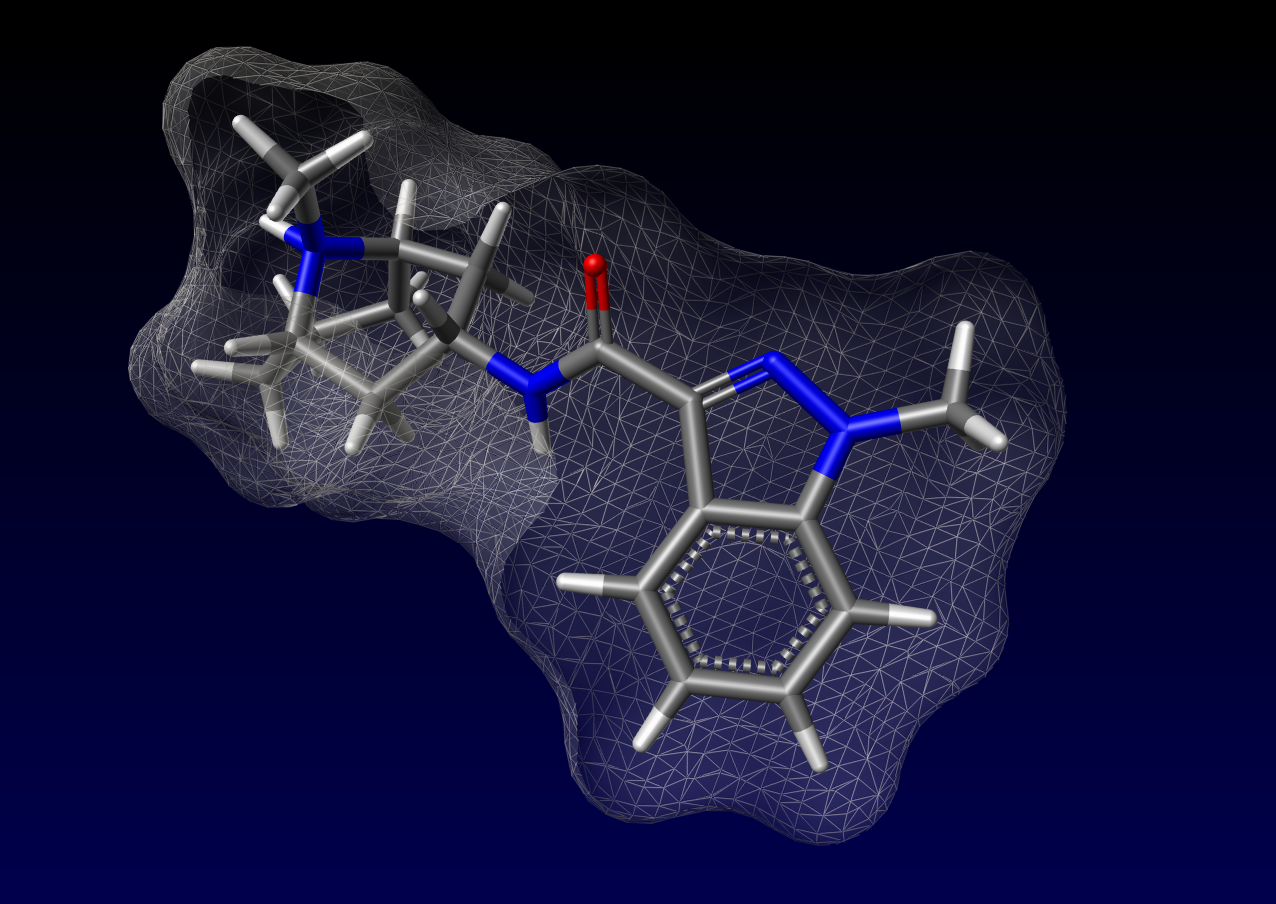

Clinical data
- Trade names: Kytril, Sancuso, others
- AHFS/Drugs.com: Monograph
- MedlinePlus: a601211
- License data: EU EMA: by INN
- Pregnancy category: AU: B1
- Routes of administration: By mouth, intravenous, transdermal
- ATC code: A04AA02 (WHO)

Legal status
- Legal status: AU: S4 (Prescription only); UK: POM (Prescription only); US: ℞-only; EU: Rx-only

Pharmacokinetic data
- Bioavailability: 60%
- Protein binding: 65%
- Metabolism: Hepatic
- Elimination half-life: 3–14 hours
- Excretion: Renal 11–12%, faecal 38%

Identifiers
- IUPAC name: 1-Methyl-N-((1R,3r,5S)-9-methyl-9-azabicyclo[3.3.1]nonan-3-yl)-1H-indazole-3-carboxamide
- CAS Number: 109889-09-0
- PubChem CID: 3510
- IUPHAR/BPS: 2300; [^{3}H]granisetron: 2292
- DrugBank: DB00889
- ChemSpider: 10482033
- UNII: WZG3J2MCOL
- KEGG: D04370
- ChEBI: CHEBI:5537
- ChEMBL: ChEMBL519643
- CompTox Dashboard (EPA): DTXSID0023111
- ECHA InfoCard: 100.212.327

Chemical and physical data
- Formula: C_{18}H_{24}N_{4}O
- Molar mass: 312.417 g·mol^{−1}
- 3D model (JSmol): Interactive image
- SMILES: CN4[C@@H]1CCC[C@H]4C[C@H](C1)NC(=O)c3nn(C)c2ccccc23
- InChI: InChI=1S/C18H24N4O/c1-21-13-6-5-7-14(21)11-12(10-13)19-18(23)17-15-8-3-4-9-16(15)22(2)20-17/h3-4,8-9,12-14H,5-7,10-11H2,1-2H3,(H,19,23)/t12-,13+,14-; Key:MFWNKCLOYSRHCJ-BTTYYORXSA-N

Granisetron is a serotonin 5-HT_{3} receptor antagonist used as an antiemetic to treat nausea and vomiting following chemotherapy and radiotherapy. Its main effect is to reduce the activity of the vagus nerve, which is a nerve that activates the vomiting center in the medulla oblongata. It does not have much effect on vomiting due to motion sickness. This drug does not have any effect on dopamine receptors or muscarinic receptors.

Granisetron was developed by chemists working at the British drug company Beecham c. 1985 and is available as a generic. It is produced by Roche Laboratories under the trade name Kytril. The drug was approved in the United Kingdom in 1991 and in United States in 1994 by the FDA.

A granisetron transdermal patch with the trade name Sancuso was approved by the US FDA on September 12, 2008. Sancuso is manufactured by 3M Drug Delivery Systems for Kyowa Kirin, Inc.

It was patented in 1985 and approved for medical use in 1991. Granisetron is a therapeutic alternative on the World Health Organization's List of Essential Medicines.

== Medical uses ==
=== Chemotherapy ===
It may be used for chemotherapy-induced nausea and vomiting and appears to work about the same as ondansetron. The most common side-effects of chemotherapy treatment are nausea, vomiting and diarrhea. This is one type of drug that a doctor can prescribe to prevent, lessen, or relieve discomfort.

=== Post operative ===
A number of medications including granisetron appear to be effective in controlling post-operative nausea and vomiting (PONV). It is unclear if it is more or less effective than other agents such as droperidol, metoclopramide, or ondansetron.

=== Gastroparesis ===
The granisetron patch (Sancuso) has been studied for use in gastroparesis, though it is not FDA approved for this indication.

=== Other ===
- Is a possible therapy for nausea and vomiting due to acute or chronic medical illness or acute gastroenteritis
- Treatment of cyclic vomiting syndrome although there are no formal trials to confirm efficacy.

== Adverse effects ==
Granisetron is a well-tolerated drug with few side effects. Headache, dizziness, and constipation are the most commonly reported side effects associated with its use. There have been no significant drug interactions reported with this drug's use. It is broken down by the liver's cytochrome P450 system and it has little effect on the metabolism of other drugs broken down by this system.

== Extended release ==
An extended release injectable version of granisetron, known as Sustol is also available in the United States as of 2016. The long acting form is used for the treatment of both acute and delayed CINV in moderately emetogenic chemotherapy and anthrocycline and/or cyclophosphamide (AC) highly emetogenic regimens. In its review, the FDA did not grant the broad HEC label to the drug citing the focus on AC regimens, primarily breast-cancer, and lack of data.
