= Antiemetic =

Drug used to prevent nausea or vomiting

An antiemetic is a drug that is effective against vomiting and nausea. Antiemetics are typically used to treat motion sickness and the side effects of opioid analgesics, general anaesthetics, and chemotherapy directed against cancer. They may be used for severe cases of gastroenteritis, especially if the patient is dehydrated.

Some antiemetics previously thought to cause birth defects appear safe for use by pregnant women in the treatment of morning sickness and the more serious hyperemesis gravidarum.

== Types ==
- 5-HT_{3} receptor antagonists block serotonin receptors in the central nervous system and gastrointestinal tract. As such, they can be used to treat post-operative and cytotoxic drug nausea & vomiting. However, they can also cause constipation, dry mouth, and fatigue.
  - Dolasetron (Anzemet) can be administered in tablet form or in an injection.
  - Granisetron (Kytril, Sancuso) can be administered in tablet (Kytril), oral solution (Kytril), injection (Kytril), or in a single transdermal patch to the upper arm (SANCUSO).
  - Ondansetron (Zofran) is administered in an oral tablet form, orally dissolving tablet form, orally dissolving film, sublingual, or in an IV/IM injection.
  - Tropisetron (Setrovel, Navoban) can be administered in oral capsules or in injection form.
  - Palonosetron (Aloxi) can be administered in an injection or in oral capsules.
- Dopamine antagonists block dopamine receptors on the brainstem and gastrointestinal tract. They are used to treat nausea and vomiting associated with cancer, radiation sickness, opioids, cytotoxic drugs and general anaesthetics. Side effects include restlessness and tardive dyskinesia.
  - Amisulpride (Barhemsys), administered by intravenous injection.
  - Domperidone (Motilium)
  - Droperidol
  - Olanzapine (Zyprexa)
  - Haloperidol (limited in usefulness by extra-pyramidal and sedative side-effects)
  - Alizapride
  - Prochlorperazine (Compazine, Stemzine, Buccastem, Stemetil, Phenotil)
  - Chlorpromazine (Use limited by sedating properties)
  - Metoclopramide
- NK1 receptor antagonist which block NK1, also known as substance P. They are typically only used in the context of chemotherapy induced nausea and vomiting.
  - Aprepitant (Emend) is a commercially available NK1 receptor antagonist
  - Casopitant is an investigational NK1 receptor antagonist
  - Rolapitant (Varubi) another recently approved drug from this class
- Antihistamines (H_{1} histamine receptor antagonists) are effective in many conditions, including motion sickness, morning sickness in pregnancy, and to combat opioid nausea. H1 receptors in central areas include area postrema and vomiting center in the vestibular nucleus. Also, many of the antihistamines listed here also block muscarinic acetylcholine receptors. They are known to cause significant sedation.
  - Cinnarizine (UK only)
  - Cyclizine
  - Diphenhydramine (Benadryl)
  - Dimenhydrinate (Gravol, Dramamine)
  - Doxylamine (Bonjesta, Unisom)
  - Mirtazapine (Remeron) is an antidepressant that also has antiemetic effects. It is a potent histamine H1 receptor antagonist, K_{i}=1.6 nM, and also exhibits notable 5-HT_{3} antagonism.
  - Meclizine (Bonine, Antivert)
  - Promethazine (Pentazine, Phenergan, Promacot) can be administered via a rectal suppository, intravenous injection, oral tablet or oral suspension for adults and children over 2 years of age.
  - Hydroxyzine (Vistaril)
- Cannabinoids are used in patients with cachexia, cytotoxic nausea, and vomiting, or who are unresponsive to other agents. These may cause changes in perception, dizziness, and loss of coordination.
  - Cannabis, also known as medical marijuana in the United States, is a Schedule I drug.
  - Nabilone
  - Dronabinol (Marinol/Syndros) is a Schedule II drug in the U.S. when in an oral solution (Syndros), and Schedule III when in sesame oil and encapsulated in a soft gelatin capsule (Marinol).
  - Some synthetic cannabinoids such as Nabilone (Cesamet) or the JWH series.
  - Sativex is an oral spray containing THC and CBD. It is currently legal in Canada and a few countries in Europe and the US as of June 25, 2018
- Benzodiazepines (GABA receptor positive allosteric modulators)
  - Midazolam (Versed) is given at the onset of anesthesia and has been shown in recent trials to be as effective as ondansetron, but most effective when used in combination with ondansetron.
  - Lorazepam (Ativan) is said to be very good as an adjunct treatment for nausea along with first line medications such as Compazine.
- Anticholinergics
  - Hyoscine (also known as scopolamine)
  - Atropine
- Steroids
  - Dexamethasone (Decadron) is given in low dose at the onset of a general anesthetic as an effective antiemetic. It is also used in chemotherapy as a single drug as well as with other antiemetics such as 5-HT_{3} receptor antagonists and NK1 receptor antagonist, but the specific mechanism of action is not fully understood.
- Other
  - Trimethobenzamide is thought to work on the CTZ
  - Ginger contains 5-HT_{3} antagonists gingerols, shogaols, and galanolactone. Preliminary clinical data suggests ginger may be effective for treatment of nausea and/or vomiting in a number of settings.
  - Emetrol is also claimed to be an effective antiemetic.
  - Propofol is given intravenously. It has been used in an acute care setting in hospital as a rescue therapy for emesis.
  - Muscimol is purported to have antiemetic activity.

== See also ==
- Cancer and nausea
- Emetic – substances that induce nausea and vomiting
