= Postoperative nausea and vomiting =

- Specialty: Anesthesia

Postoperative nausea and vomiting (PONV) is nausea, vomiting, or retching following surgery, commonly experienced during the first 24 hours. It occurs in about 20–30% of all people undergoing surgery and can affect 70–80% of patients at high risk. It can cause distress and delay recovery or discharge.

Risk depends on patient characteristics, the type of surgical procedure, and the type and duration of anesthesia. Common adult risk factors include female sex, a history of PONV or motion sickness, nonsmoking, and postoperative opioid use. Prevention combines risk assessment, measures to reduce risk, and medications that prevent nausea and vomiting, called antiemetics. Treatment of symptoms that occur despite prevention takes account of the medications already given.

== Cause ==
=== Risk factors ===
Risk factors for PONV include patient characteristics, the surgical procedure, and anesthesia-related factors.

==== Patient-related ====
The simplified Apfel score estimates adult PONV risk using four factors:

- Female sex
- Nonsmoking
- A history of PONV or motion sickness
- Postoperative opioid use

With zero to four factors, estimated risks are approximately 10%, 20%, 40%, 60%, and 80%, respectively.

==== Surgical ====
Risk varies with surgery type and duration. Procedures associated with increased risk include gynecological, gastrointestinal, and ear, nose, and throat surgery. In children, examples include strabismus repair and tonsil or adenoid removal.

==== Anesthetic-related ====
Volatile anesthetics, nitrous oxide, and opioid medications increase PONV risk. Opioids can stimulate pathways involved in vomiting and slow stomach emptying and intestinal movement.

==== Children ====
The postoperative vomiting in children (POVOC) score includes age of at least three years, surgery lasting more than 30 minutes, strabismus surgery, and a history of postoperative vomiting in the child or PONV in parents or siblings. Rates are similar in boys and girls before puberty and higher in girls afterward.

== Mechanism ==
Nausea and vomiting after surgery involve several receptor systems that respond to chemical signals, including histamine, dopamine, serotonin, acetylcholine, opioids, and neurokinins. Signals from the inner ear's balance system and signals that travel from the gut to the brain through the vagus nerve (cranial nerve X) can contribute to nausea and vomiting after surgery.

== Prevention ==
Prevention addresses both baseline risk and medication choices. Approaches include limiting opioid use through other forms of pain relief, using nerve blocks when appropriate, and using propofol-based intravenous anesthesia instead of volatile anesthetics. Combining antiemetic drugs is generally more effective at preventing vomiting than using a single drug, although evidence about adverse effects varies among agents.

=== Preventive medications ===
Medications used for prevention act on several receptor systems. Examples include:

- Serotonin (5-HT3) receptor blockers, such as ondansetron and palonosetron
- The corticosteroid dexamethasone
- The antimuscarinic scopolamine, delivered through a skin patch
- Dopamine receptor blockers, such as droperidol and amisulpride
- Neurokinin-1 receptor blockers, such as aprepitant

The timing and duration of action differ among drugs. Selection also depends on adverse effects. Ondansetron can affect the heart's electrical activity by prolonging the QT interval, scopolamine can cause dry mouth or blurred vision, and dexamethasone can raise blood glucose.

=== Intravenous fluids ===
A 2019 Cochrane review found that additional intravenous crystalloid fluids probably reduce postoperative nausea and vomiting in generally healthy people receiving general anesthesia for outpatient procedures or short hospital stays. Effects on unexpected hospital admission were uncertain. The included studies did not report data on serious adverse events, so the risk of those events remains unknown.

== Management ==
Treatment of nausea and vomiting after surgery is often called rescue treatment. When symptoms occur despite preventive medication, the Fifth Consensus Guidelines recommend using an antiemetic from a different drug class. Evidence about the best rescue medication remains limited.

The choice of rescue treatment also depends on how long previously administered medications remain active. If alternatives are unavailable, a short-acting serotonin (5-HT3) receptor blocker or butyrophenone may be repeated after more than six hours. Longer-acting medications require different considerations. Scopolamine patches have a slow onset, and dexamethasone is not commonly repeated for breakthrough symptoms.

Nausea and vomiting can also develop after discharge. Planning for patients at risk includes instructions about managing symptoms at home and obtaining rescue medication.

== Complementary approaches ==
Several complementary approaches have been studied for preventing postoperative nausea and vomiting. A 2025 Cochrane review found that stimulation of the PC6 point at the wrist, using methods such as acupuncture or acupressure, may reduce nausea and vomiting compared with sham treatment. Combining some techniques with antiemetic medication may also help. Confidence in much of the evidence was low, and evidence about minor adverse effects was very uncertain.

A 2022 systematic review of seven studies involving 576 participants found that music interventions reduced postoperative vomiting, but did not establish a reduction in nausea. The authors called for further studies.

A 2021 systematic review found that ginger reduced nausea severity and the need for rescue antiemetics compared with placebo. Further trials comparing ginger with standard preventive antiemetics were needed.

== Complications ==
Postoperative nausea and vomiting can cause distress, prolong recovery, and delay discharge. Less common complications include pulmonary aspiration, in which stomach contents enter the lungs, and disruption of surgical wounds.

== Epidemiology ==
Reported rates of postoperative nausea and vomiting vary with the population, type of surgery, anesthesia, and preventive treatment. A 2020 systematic review described typical rates of 20–30%, rising to 70–80% in patients at high risk.
