= Tropisetron =

Serotonin antagonist/antiemetic

Clinical data
- Trade names: Navoban
- Other names: ICS 205-930, 3-tropanyl-indole-3-carboxylate
- AHFS/Drugs.com: International Drug Names
- Pregnancy category: AU: B3
- Routes of administration: Oral, intravenous
- ATC code: A04AA03 (WHO)

Legal status
- Legal status: AU: S4 (Prescription only); UK: POM (Prescription only)

Pharmacokinetic data
- Bioavailability: ~60–80%
- Protein binding: 71%
- Metabolism: Liver (CYP3A4, CYP1A2, CYP2D6)
- Elimination half-life: 6–8 hours
- Excretion: Kidney, Feces

Identifiers
- IUPAC name: (1R,5S)-8-methyl-8-azabicyclo[3.2.1]octan-3-yl 1methyl-indole-3-carboxylate
- CAS Number: 89565-68-4
- PubChem CID: 72165
- IUPHAR/BPS: 260
- DrugBank: DB11699
- ChemSpider: 16736476
- UNII: 6I819NIK1W
- KEGG: D02130
- ChEBI: CHEBI:32269
- ChEMBL: ChEMBL496980
- CompTox Dashboard (EPA): DTXSID2044137

Chemical and physical data
- Formula: C_{17}H_{20}N_{2}O_{2}
- Molar mass: 284.359 g·mol^{−1}
- 3D model (JSmol): Interactive image
- SMILES: CN4[C@@H]1CC[C@H]4C[C@H](C1)OC(=O)c3c[nH]c2ccccc23
- InChI: InChI=1S/C17H20N2O2/c1-19-11-6-7-12(19)9-13(8-11)21-17(20)15-10-18-16-5-3-2-4-14(15)16/h2-5,10-13,18H,6-9H2,1H3/t11-,12+,13+; Key:ZNRGQMMCGHDTEI-ITGUQSILSA-N

Tropisetron is a serotonin 5-HT_{3} receptor antagonist used mainly as an antiemetic to treat nausea and vomiting following chemotherapy, although it has been used experimentally as an analgesic in cases of fibromyalgia.

It was patented in 1982 and approved for medical use in 1992. Tropisetron is a therapeutic alternative on the World Health Organization's List of Essential Medicines. It is sold by Novartis in Europe, Australia, New Zealand, Japan, South Korea and the Philippines as Navoban, but is not available in the US. It is also available from Novell Pharmaceutical Laboratories and sold in several Asian countries as Setrovel.

== Pharmacology ==
Tropisetron acts as both a selective 5-HT_{3} receptor antagonist and α_{7}-nicotinic receptor partial agonist.

Tropisetron have been shown to sensitise human α_{7}-nicotinic receptors to low concentrations of acetylcholine, indicative of a possible co-agonist or other modulatory action of tropisetron at these receptors.

== Adverse effects ==
Tropisetron is a well-tolerated drug with few side effects. Headache, constipation, and dizziness are the most commonly reported side effects associated with its use. Hypotension, transient liver enzyme elevation, immune hypersensitivity syndromes and extrapyramidal side effects have also been associated with its use on at least one occasion. There have been no significant drug interactions reported with this drug's use. It is broken down by the hepatic cytochrome P450 system and it has little effect on the metabolism of other drugs broken down by this system.

== Other uses ==
As a biological stain and as trypanocide.
