= Tetrahydrocannabinol/cannabidiol =

THC/CBD
- Tetrahydrocannabinol (THC)

- Cannabidiol (CBD)

Combination of
- Tetrahydrocannabinol: Cannabinoid
- Cannabidiol: Cannabinoid

Clinical data
- Other names: Cannabidiol/tetrahydrocannabinol; THC/CBD; CBD/THC; CanChew; MedChew
- Routes of administration: Buccal (chewing gum)

Tetrahydrocannabinol/cannabidiol (THC/CBD), also known as CanChew or MedChew, is a combination of the cannabinoids tetrahydrocannabinol (THC) and cannabidiol (CBD) which is or was under development for the treatment of dementia, pain, Parkinson's disease, postherpetic neuralgia, psychotic disorders, restless legs syndrome (RLS), and irritable bowel syndrome (IBS). It is taken bucally as a chewing gum. The drug is or was under development by Axim Biotech. As of May 2023, no recent development has been reported for all indications.

== See also ==
- List of investigational analgesics
- List of investigational Parkinson's disease drugs
- List of investigational restless legs syndrome drugs
- Tetrahydrocannabinol/cannabinol/cannabidiol
- Dronabinol, nabilone, nabiximols
- Medical cannabis
