= GW Pharmaceuticals =

British pharmaceutics company

GW Pharmaceuticals Limited
- Formerly: GW Pharmaceuticals Group PLC (2001–2001); GW Pharmaceuticals PLC (2001–2021)
- Company type: Subsidiary
- Traded as: Nasdaq: GWPH
- Industry: Pharmaceutical industry
- Founded: 1998; 28 years ago
- Founder: Geoffrey Guy; Brian Whittle
- Headquarters: Cambridge, United Kingdom
- Key people: Justin Gover (CEO)
- Products: Epidiolex (Epidyolex in Europe); Nabiximols (Sativex)
- Revenue: ▲$527 million (2020)
- Net income: ▼ -$58 million (2020)
- Total assets: ▲$939 million (2020)
- Total equity: ▲$741 million (2020)
- Number of employees: 1,161 (2020)
- Parent: Jazz Pharmaceuticals
- Website: gwpharm.co.uk

GW Pharmaceuticals Limited is a British pharmaceutics company known for its multiple sclerosis treatment product nabiximols (brand name, Sativex) which was the first natural cannabis plant derivative to gain market approval in any country. Another cannabis-based product, Epidiolex, was approved for treatment of epilepsy by the US Food and Drug Administration in 2018. It is a subsidiary of Jazz Pharmaceuticals.

== History ==
GW Pharmaceuticals was founded in 1998 by doctors Geoffrey Guy and Brian Whittle. That year, they obtained a cultivation license from the United Kingdom Home Office and the MHRA, allowing the company to cultivate, possess and supply cannabis to conduct scientific research concerning medical cannabis.

Later in 1998, GW Pharmaceuticals entered into a contract with Hortapharm B.V., a cannabis research and development corporation based in Amsterdam.

In 2001, GW Pharmaceuticals listed on the Alternative Investment Market, the junior market of the London Stock Exchange. In May 2013, the company became dual-listed on the NASDAQ and AIM.

In 2014, the company made a deal with New York to develop clinical trials using cannabidiol (CBD) to treat children who suffer from seizures and other medical complications.

In May 2021, Jazz Pharmaceuticals acquired the company.

== Products ==
=== Sativex ===
Nabiximols (trade name Sativex) is a botanical drug that is a cannabis extract, administered as a mouth spray; it was approved in the UK in 2010 as a treatment for multiple sclerosis (MS) patients to alleviate neuropathic pain, spasticity, overactive bladder, and other symptoms.

Nabiximols is made with two unknown Cannabis strains, and is extracted with ethanol and carbon dioxide.

In 2020, GW Pharmaceuticals concluded a partnership with Bayer for the distribution of Sativex in the UK. It has an estimated annual production of 100 tons of medicinal cannabis.

=== Epidiolex ===
In 2015, GW Pharmaceutical initiated Phase 3 clinical trials of cannabidiol oral solution for treatment of two rare diseases in children – Dravet syndrome and Lennox–Gastaut syndrome. In August 2015, GW received FDA Fast Track Development Program designation from the US Food and Drug Administration for use of the drug candidate to treat newborns with epilepsy.

The drug, under the brand name Epidiolex, was given US Food and Drug Administration approval in June 2018. It was subsequently given European EMA approval in September 2019 under the brand name Epidyolex.

== See also ==
- Dronabinol
- Marinol
- Nabilone
- Medical use of cannabis
