= Geoffrey Guy =

British pharmacologist, physician, businessman and academic

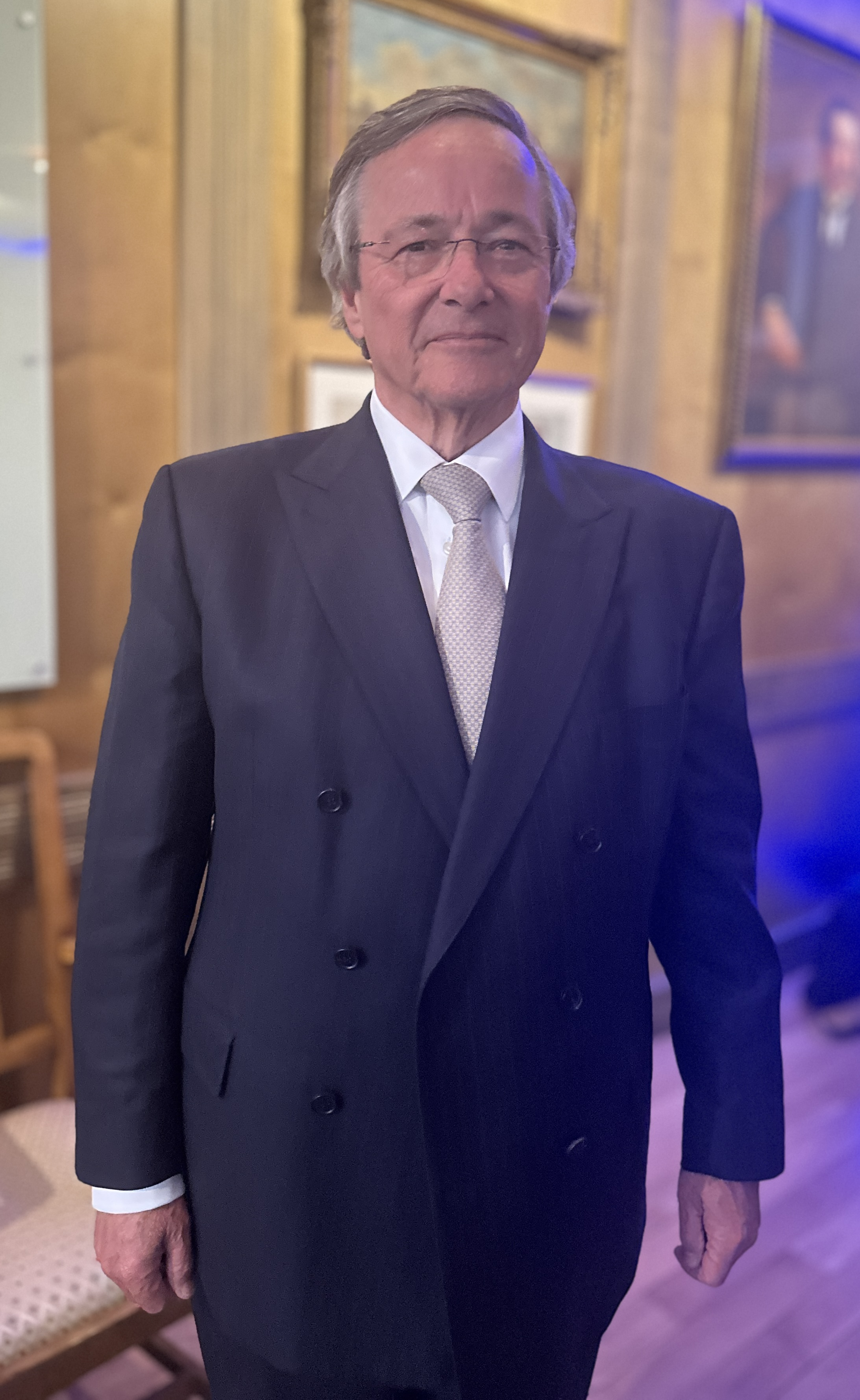
- Geoffrey Guy at the Royal Society of Medicine (2024)
- Born: 1954 (age 71–72); Stanmore, Middlesex, England
- Education: St Peter's School, Bournemouth; University of London; St Bartholomew's Hospital
- Known for: Co-founder GW Pharmaceuticals
- Medical career
- Research: Opiates; Cannabinoids
- Notable works: The Medicinal Uses of Cannabis and Cannabinoids (2004)

Geoffrey William Guy (born 1954) is a British pharmacologist, physician, businessman and academic, who co-founded GW Pharmaceuticals and has developed treatments using compounds found in cannabis, which are the first cannabis-based medicines approved by and available on the British National Health Service (NHS).

In the 1980s and 1990s he was successful in the opiate painkiller business, and held appointments at the Laboratoires Pierre Fabre and the Napp laboratories. He was a member of the editorial board of the Journal of Cannabis Therapeutics, and has authored, contributed to and edited over 200 clinical studies and several books including The Medicinal Uses of Cannabis and Cannabinoids (2004).

== Early life and education ==
Geoffrey Guy was born in 1954 in Stanmore, Middlesex, the only son and the youngest of three of a hospital administrator and his wife, a trainee nurse. Until age 13, he lived in Christchurch, Dorset, before moving to Barton on Sea. During his teens, he attended St Peter's School in Bournemouth, played rugby and was a member of the Air Training Corps.

Following A levels at a sixth form college near Brockenhurst, Guy gained admission to study medicine at St Bartholomew's Hospital, London. He graduated with a bachelor's degree in pharmacology from the University of London in 1976. In 1979, he gained a medical degree from St Bartholomew's and in the same year completed his MRCS Eng., LRCP, and LMSSA of the Society of Apothecaries. In 1984 he gained a Diploma of Pharmaceutical Medicine from the Royal College of Physicians.

== Career ==
Guy began his career in the pharmaceutics industry in 1980 and became successful in the opiate painkiller business. From 1981 to 1983, he served as international clinical research co-ordinator at Laboratoires Pierre Fabre, where his research involved seeking out active ingredients in plants for the purpose of developing medicines. It led to the concept that there could be ingredients in the same plant that acted in opposition to each other.

From 1983 to 1985 he was director of clinical development at the Napp laboratories in Cambridge, where he worked on several opiates, including developing the slow-release morphine, morphine sulphate. He also worked to develop a medicine from a ten-component Chinese medicine, to treat atopic eczema. In 1985 he founded Ethical Holdings plc. In 1990, he co-founded the plant-medicines company that became Phytopharm plc, and became its chairman until 1997.

In 1998, he co-founded GW Pharmaceuticals with Brian Whittle. He obtained a licence from the UK Home Office to conduct research on compounds found in cannabis that might be useful as medicines. The first plants were grown in 1998 at a climate-controlled greenhouse in Southern England and clinical trials began the following year. Some insights into how this came about were later recounted in a witness seminar organised by the Wellcome Trust. His company was the first to obtain regulatory approval for a medicine based on cannabis in the UK since the 1930s. In June 2010, GW launched sativex in the UK, a fully approved cannabis-based medicine that subsequently rose interest worldwide. Licensed by the UK Medicines and Healthcare products Regulatory Agency, it is a prescription-only medicine for the treatment of spasticity due to multiple sclerosis. Its principal active components are the cannabinoids tetrahydrocannabinol (THC) and cannabidiol (CBD) in a ratio of approximately 50:50. Later, GW initiated clinical trials of a cannabidiol solution for the treatment of two rare forms of epilepsy in children; Lennox–Gastaut syndrome and Dravet syndrome. In 2018, the drug, under the brand name epidiolex, became the first cannabis-based medicine to obtain US Food and Drug Administration approval. In 2019, both sativex and epidiolex were made available to patients under the UK National Health Service.

In early 2021, it was announced that GW would be acquired by Dublin-based Jazz Pharmaceuticals for US$7.2 billion. The deal was completed in May 2021, at which time Guy resigned from the chairmanship of the company.

== Writing ==
Guy was a member of the editorial board of the Journal of Cannabis Therapeutics, and has contributed to at least six books and more than 200 clinical studies.

In 2004 he was co-editor of The Medicinal Uses of Cannabis and Cannabinoids. In 2006, he co-authored a paper titled "A tale of two cannabinoids" which compared the use of CBD and THC.

== Awards and honours ==
In 2011 Guy was recipient of the Deloitte Director of the Year Award in Pharmaceuticals and Healthcare. In the same year he was appointed as visiting professor in the School of Science and Medicine at the University of Buckingham. In 2016, he was awarded the honorary degree of Doctor of Science from the University of Reading and was also appointed visiting professor at the University of Westminster.

== Other roles ==
Guy is on the board of trustees for Leweston School.

== Selected publications ==
=== Books ===
- Guy, Geoffrey William; Whittle, Brian Anthony; Robson, Philip (2004). The Medicinal Uses of Cannabis and Cannabinoids. Pharmaceutical Press. ISBN 978-0-85369-517-2.
- Guy, Geoffrey (2021). A Worthwhile Medicine: How the World's First Cannabis-Based Medication Was Approved. London: Profile Books. ISBN 978-1-78816-763-5.

=== Articles ===
- Whittle, Brian A.; Guy, Geoffrey W.; Robson, Philip (1 June 2001). "Prospects for New Cannabis-Based Prescription Medicines". Journal of Cannabis Therapeutics. 1 (3–4): 183–205. doi:10.1300/J175v01n03_12. ISSN 1529-9775. (Co-authored)
- Russo, Ethan; Guy, Geoffrey W. (2006). "A tale of two cannabinoids: the therapeutic rationale for combining tetrahydrocannabinol and cannabidiol". Medical Hypotheses. 66 (2): 234–246. doi:10.1016/j.mehy.2005.08.026. ISSN 0306-9877. PMID 16209908. (Co-authored)
- Russo, Ethan B.; Guy, Geoffrey W.; Robson, Philip J. (2007). "Cannabis, Pain, and Sleep: Lessons from Therapeutic Clinical Trials of Sativex®, a Cannabis-Based Medicine". Chemistry & Biodiversity. 4 (8): 1729–1743. doi:10.1002/cbdv.200790150. ISSN 1612-1880. PMID 17712817. S2CID 38580755. (Co-authored)
- Nunn, Alistair V.W.; Guy, Geoffrey W.; Bell, Jimmy D. (15 August 2016). "The quantum mitochondrion and optimal health". Biochemical Society Transactions. 44 (4): 1101–1110. doi:10.1042/BST20160096. ISSN 0300-5127. PMC 5264502. PMID 27528758. (Co-authored)
