= Cannabis use disorder =

Continued use of cannabis despite clinically significant impairment

- Other names: Cannabis addiction, marijuana addiction
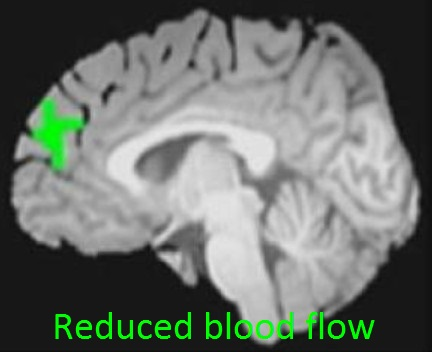
- Reduced blood flow in prefrontal cortex of adolescent cannabis users
- Specialty: Addiction medicine, psychiatry
- Symptoms: Dependency of THC and other cannabinoids and withdrawal symptoms upon cessation such as anxiety, irritability, depression, depersonalization, restlessness, insomnia, vivid dreams, gastrointestinal problems, and decreased appetite
- Risk factors: Adolescence and high-frequency use
- Treatment: Psychotherapy
- Medication: None approved, experimental only

Addiction and dependence glossary
- addiction – a neuropsychological disorder characterized by a persistent and intense urge to use a drug or engage in a behavior that produces natural reward; addictive drug – psychoactive substances that with repeated use are associated with significantly higher rates of substance use disorders, due in large part to the drug's effect on brain reward systems; dependence – an adaptive state associated with a withdrawal syndrome upon cessation of repeated exposure to a stimulus (e.g., drug intake); drug sensitization or reverse tolerance – the escalating effect of a drug resulting from repeated administration at a given dose; drug withdrawal – symptoms that occur upon cessation of repeated drug use; physical dependence – dependence that involves persistent physical–somatic withdrawal symptoms (e.g., delirium tremens and nausea); psychological dependence – dependence that is characterized by emotional-motivational withdrawal symptoms (e.g., anhedonia and anxiety) that affect cognitive functioning.; reinforcing stimuli – stimuli that increase the probability of repeating behaviors paired with them; rewarding stimuli – stimuli that the brain interprets as intrinsically positive and desirable or as something to approach; sensitization – an amplified response to a stimulus resulting from repeated exposure to it; substance use disorder – a condition in which the use of substances leads to clinically and functionally significant impairment or distress; drug tolerance – the diminishing effect of a drug resulting from repeated administration at a given dose

Cannabis use disorder (CUD), also known as cannabis addiction or marijuana addiction, is a psychiatric disorder defined in the fifth revision of the Diagnostic and Statistical Manual of Mental Disorders (DSM-5) and ICD-11 as the continued use of cannabis despite clinically significant impairment.

There is a common misconception that cannabis use disorder does not exist, as people describe cannabis as non-addictive. Cannabis use disorder is the clinical name for cannabis addiction. Cannabis is one of the most widely used drugs globally. According to the National Survey on Drug Use and Health, in 2024, nearly 7% of US teens and adults met the criteria for cannabis use disorder. Among those aged 18–25, this rate is nearly 16%.

Cannabis use is linked to a range of mental health issues, including mood and anxiety disorders, and in some individuals, it may act as a form of self-medication for psychiatric disorders. Long-term use can lead to dependence, with an estimated 9–20% of users—particularly daily users—developing cannabis use disorder (CUD). Risk factors for developing CUD include early and frequent use, high THC potency, co-use with tobacco or alcohol, adverse childhood experiences, and genetic predispositions. Adolescents are especially vulnerable due to their stage of neurodevelopment and social influences, and CUD in youth is associated with poor cognitive and psychiatric outcomes, including a heightened risk of suicide attempts and self-harm.

Cannabis withdrawal, affecting about half of those in treatment, can include symptoms like irritability, anxiety, insomnia, and depression. There are no FDA-approved medications for CUD. Current evidence for medication in the setting of CUD is weak and inconclusive. Psychological treatments, such as cognitive behavioral therapy (CBT), motivational enhancement therapy (MET), and twelve-step programs show promise. Diagnosis is based on DSM-5 or ICD-11 criteria, and screening tools like CAST and CUDIT are used for assessment. Treatment demand is rising globally, and despite limited pharmacological options, structured psychological support can be effective in managing cannabis dependence.

== Signs and symptoms ==
Cannabis use is sometimes comorbid with other mental health problems, such as mood and anxiety disorders, and discontinuing cannabis use is difficult for some users. Psychiatric comorbidities are often present in dependent cannabis users including a range of personality disorders.

Based on annual survey data, some high school seniors who report smoking daily (nearly 7%, according to one study) may function at a lower rate in school than students who do not. The sedating and anxiolytic properties of tetrahydrocannabinol (THC) in some users might make the use of cannabis an attempt to self-medicate personality or psychiatric disorders.

=== Dependence ===
Prolonged cannabis use produces both pharmacokinetic changes (how the drug is absorbed, distributed, metabolized, and excreted) and pharmacodynamic changes (how the drug interacts with target cells) in the body. These changes require the user to consume higher doses of the drug to achieve a common desirable effect (known as a higher tolerance), reinforcing the body's metabolic systems for eliminating the drug more efficiently and further down-regulating cannabinoid receptors in the brain.

Cannabis users have shown decreased reactivity to dopamine, suggesting a possible link to a dampening of the reward system of the brain and an increase in negative emotion and addiction severity.

Cannabis users can develop tolerance to the effects of THC. Tolerance to the behavioral and psychological effects of THC has been demonstrated in adolescent humans and animals. The mechanisms that create this tolerance to THC are thought to involve changes in cannabinoid receptor function.

One study has shown that between 2001–2002 and 2012–2013, the use of cannabis in the US doubled.

Cannabis dependence develops in about 9% of users, significantly less than that of heroin, cocaine, alcohol, and prescribed anxiolytics, but slightly higher than that for psilocybin, mescaline, or LSD. Of those who use cannabis daily, 10–20% develop dependence.

=== Withdrawal ===
Cannabis withdrawal symptoms occur in half of people being treated for cannabis use disorder. Symptoms may include dysphoria, anxiety, irritability, depression, restlessness, disturbed sleep, gastrointestinal symptoms, and decreased appetite. It is often paired with rhythmic movement disorder. Most symptoms begin during the first week of abstinence and resolve after a few weeks. About 12% of heavy cannabis users showed cannabis withdrawal symptoms as defined by the DSM-5, and this was associated with significant disability as well as mood, anxiety, and personality disorders. Furthermore, a study on 49 dependent cannabis users over a two-week period of abstinence proved most prominently symptoms of nightmares and anger issues.

Sleep disturbances can vary throughout the period of cannabis abstinence and may include difficulty falling asleep and changes in overall sleep quality. Baumer et al. (2023) found that sleep difficulties among adolescents increased during the first week of abstinence, decreased during the second week and then remained relatively stable the following weeks, returning to similar baseline levels in about four weeks. Lee et al. (2024) conducted a randomized controlled trial involving adults receiving treatment for cannabis use disorder to investigate the use of zolpidem to address sleep issues during cannabis abstinence. These findings suggest that sleep disturbances are an important part of cannabis withdrawal and may require attention during treatment. However, the severity and duration of sleep-related symptoms may vary across individuals and populations.

Although cannabis withdrawal symptoms generally begin within the first 24-28 hours after stopping, they typically reach their peak between days 2 and 6. During this period, more intense withdrawal symptoms that can make it difficult to adjust to daily life may be experienced. Depending on the individual's history and frequency of use, the severity and duration of these symptoms can vary. For those who regularly use cannabis, withdrawal can make abstinence challenging, especially during the first week. However, most symptoms start to gradually decrease over time, improving within a few weeks (Connor et al., 2022).

=== Cause ===
Cannabis addiction is often due to prolonged and increasing use of the drug. Increasing the strength of the cannabis taken and increasing use of more effective methods of delivery often increase the progression of cannabis dependency. Approximately 17.0% of weekly and 19.0% of daily cannabis smokers can be classified as cannabis dependent. In addition to cannabis use, it has been shown that co-use of cannabis and tobacco can result in an elevated risk of cannabis use disorder. Susceptibility to cannabis addiction can also stem from genetic predispositions or environmental influences that make certain individuals inherently more vulnerable to substance dependence. Moreover, prenatal exposure to cannabis—where the mother uses cannabis during pregnancy—can predispose offspring to an increased risk of developing cannabis use disorder later in life, highlighting a possible transgenerational transmission of vulnerability.

=== Risk factors ===
Certain factors are considered to heighten the risk of developing cannabis dependence. Longitudinal studies over a number of years have enabled researchers to track aspects of social and psychological development concurrently with cannabis use. Increasing evidence is being shown for the elevation of associated problems by the frequency and age at which cannabis is used, with young and frequent users being at most risk. The frequency of cannabis use and duration of use are considered to be major risk factors for development of cannabis use disorder. The strength of cannabis used, with higher THC content conferring a heightened risk, is also thought to be a risk factor. Concomitant alcohol or tobacco use, a history of adverse childhood experiences, depression or other psychiatric disorders, stressful life events and parental cannabis use may also increase the risk of developing cannabis use disorder.

The main factors in Australia, for example, related to a heightened risk for developing problems with cannabis use include frequent use at a young age; personal maladjustment; emotional distress; poor parenting; school drop-out; affiliation with drug-using peers; moving away from home at an early age; daily cigarette smoking; and ready access to cannabis. The researchers concluded there is emerging evidence that positive experiences to early cannabis use are a significant predictor of late dependence and that genetic predisposition plays a role in the development of problematic use.

=== High risk groups ===
A number of groups have been identified as being at greater risk of developing cannabis dependence and, in Australia, have been found to include adolescent populations, Aboriginal and Torres Strait Islanders and people with mental health conditions.

=== Adolescents ===
The endocannabinoid system is directly involved in adolescent brain development. Adolescent cannabis users are therefore particularly vulnerable to the potential adverse effects of cannabis use. Adolescent cannabis use is associated with increased cannabis misuse as an adult, issues with memory and concentration, long-term cognitive complications, and poor psychiatric outcomes including social anxiety, suicidality, and addiction.

There are several reasons why adolescents start a smoking habit. According to a study completed by Bill Sanders, influence from friends, difficult household problems, and experimentation are some of the reasons why this population starts to smoke cannabis. This segment of the population seems to be one of the most influenceable group there is. They want to follow the group and look "cool", "hip", and accepted by their friends. This fear of rejection plays a big role in their decision to use cannabis. However it does not seem to be the most important factor. According to a study from Canada, the lack of knowledge about cannabis seems to be the main reason why adolescents start to smoke. The authors observed a high correlation between adolescents that knew about the mental and physical harms of cannabis and their consumption. Of the 1045 young participants in the study, those who could name the least number of negative effects about this drug were usually the ones who were consuming it. They were not isolated cases either. Actually, the study showed that the proportion of teenagers who saw cannabis as a high-risk drug and the ones who thought the contrary was about the same.

In a 2023 national inpatient study, researchers found that adolescents with Cannabis Use Disorder (CUD) were at a significantly higher risk for suicide attempts and self-harm tendencies. They observed 807,105 adolescents who were hospitalized from 1 January 2016, to 31 December 2019, of which 6.9% had CUD. The study showed the majority of adolescents with CUD that were hospitalized were more likely to be older and have depression, emphasizing the association between CUD and suicide attempts/self-harm. Adolescents who were diagnosed with CUD had 2.4 times the odds of suicide attempt/self-harm. Interventions should occur early on to attempt to prevent the development of CUD and any related actions.

=== Pregnancy ===
The American College of Obstetricians and Gynecologists advises against cannabis use during pregnancy or lactation. There is an association between smoking cannabis during pregnancy and low birth weight. Smoking cannabis during pregnancy can lower the amount of oxygen delivered to the developing fetus, which can restrict fetal growth. The active ingredient in cannabis (Δ^{9}-tetrahydrocannabinol, THC) is fat soluble and can enter into breastmilk during lactation. THC in breastmilk can then subsequently be taken up by a breastfeeding infant, as shown by the presence of THC in the infant's feces. However, the evidence for long-term effects of exposure to THC through breastmilk is unclear. In a study conducted by Reproductive Health, the use of cannabis during pregnancy may also alter the neurotransmission system of the infant. Prenatal exposure to cannabis could harm their brain areas such as the "prefrontal cortex, the mesolimbic system, the striatum and the hypothalamic-pituitary axis." These areas are involved in executive functions such as the reinforcement and regulation of emotions. Thus, the consequences of exposure to maternal cannabis use could cause executive dysfunction to the emotional system that will remain present even in early adulthood.

== Diagnosis ==
Cannabis use disorder is recognized in the fifth version of the Diagnostic and Statistical Manual of Mental Disorders (DSM-5), which also added cannabis withdrawal as a new condition. In the 2013 revision for the DSM-5, DSM-IV abuse and dependence were combined into cannabis use disorder. The legal problems criterion (from cannabis abuse) has been removed, and the craving criterion was newly added, resulting in a total of eleven criteria: hazardous use, social/interpersonal problems, neglected major roles, withdrawal, tolerance, used larger amounts/longer, repeated attempts to quit/control use, much time spent using, physical/psychological problems related to use, activities given up and craving. For a diagnosis of DSM-5 cannabis use disorder, at least two of these criteria need to be present in the last twelve-month period. Additionally, three severity levels have been defined: mild (two or three criteria), moderate (four or five criteria) and severe (six or more criteria) cannabis use disorder.

Cannabis use disorder is also recognized in the eleventh revision of the International Classification of Diseases (ICD-11), adding more subdivisions including time intervals of pattern of use (episodic, continuous, or unspecified) and dependence (current, early full remission, sustained partial remission, sustained full remission, or unspecified) compared to the 10th revision.

A 2019 meta-analysis found that 34% of people with cannabis-induced psychotic disorder (CIPD) transitioned to schizophrenia. This was found to be comparatively higher than hallucinogens (26%) and amphetamines (22%).

To screen for cannabis-related problems, several methods are used. Scales specific to cannabis, which provides the benefit of being cost efficient compared to extensive diagnostic interviews, include the Cannabis Abuse Screening Test (CAST), Cannabis Use Identification Test (CUDIT), and Cannabis Use Problems Identification Test (CUPIT). Scales for general drug use disorders are also used, including the Severity Dependence Scale (SDS), Drug Use Disorder Identification Test (DUDIT), and Alcohol, Smoking, and Substance Involvement Screening Test (ASSIST). However, there are no gold standard and both older and newer scales are still in use. To quantify cannabis use, methods such as Timeline Follow-Back (TLFB) and Cannabis Use Daily (CUD) are used. These methods measure general consumption and not grams of psychoactive substance as the concentration of THC may vary among drug users.

== Treatment ==
Clinicians differentiate between casual users who have difficulty with drug screens, and daily heavy users, to a chronic user who uses multiple times a day. In the US, as of 2013, cannabis is the most commonly identified illicit substance used by people admitted to treatment facilities. Demand for treatment for cannabis use disorder increased internationally between 1995 and 2002. In the United States, the average adult who seeks treatment has consumed cannabis for over 10 years almost daily and has attempted to quit six or more times.

Treatment options for cannabis dependence are far fewer than for opioid or alcohol dependence. Most treatment falls into the categories of psychological or psychotherapeutic intervention, pharmacological intervention or treatment through peer support and environmental approaches. No medications have been found effective for cannabis dependence, but psychotherapeutic models hold promise. Screening and brief intervention sessions can be given in a variety of settings, particularly at doctors' offices, which is of importance as most cannabis users seeking help will do so from their general practitioner rather than a drug treatment service agency.

The most commonly accessed forms of treatment in Australia are 12-step programmes, physicians, rehabilitation programmes, and detox services, with inpatient and outpatient services equally accessed. In the EU approximately 20% of all primary admissions and 29% of all new drug clients in 2005, had primary cannabis problems. And in all countries that reported data between 1999 and 2005 the number of people seeking treatment for cannabis use increased.

=== Psychological ===
Psychological intervention includes cognitive behavioral therapy (CBT), motivational enhancement therapy (MET), contingency management (CM), supportive-expressive psychotherapy (SEP), family and systems interventions, and twelve-step programs.

Evaluations of Marijuana Anonymous programs, modelled on the 12-step lines of Alcoholics Anonymous and Narcotics Anonymous, have shown small beneficial effects for general drug use reduction. In 2006, the Wisconsin Initiative to Promote Healthy Lifestyles implemented a program that helps primary care physicians identify and address marijuana use problems in patients.

=== Medication ===
No medication has been proven effective for treating cannabis use disorder; research is focused on three treatment approaches: agonist substitution, antagonist, and modulation of other neurotransmitter systems. More broadly, the goal of medication therapy for cannabis use disorder centers around targeting the stages of the addiction: acute intoxication/binge, withdrawal/negative affect, and preoccupation/anticipation.

For the treatment of the withdrawal/negative affect symptom domain of cannabis use disorder, medications may work by alleviating restlessness, irritable or depressed mood, anxiety, and insomnia. Bupropion, which is a norepinephrine–dopamine reuptake inhibitor, has been studied for the treatment of withdrawal with largely poor results. Atomoxetine, a norepinephrine reuptake inhibitor, has also shown poor results, though it does increase the release of dopamine through downstream effects in the prefrontal cortex (an area of the brain responsible for planning complex tasks and behavior). Venlafaxine, a serotonin–norepinephrine reuptake inhibitor, has also been studied for cannabis use disorder, with the thought that the serotonergic component may be useful for the depressed mood or anxious dimensions of the withdrawal symptom domain. While venlafaxine has been shown to improve mood for people with cannabis use disorder, a clinical trial in this population actually found worse cannabis abstinence rates compared to placebo. It is worth noting that venlafaxine is sometimes poorly tolerated, and infrequent use or abrupt discontinuation of its use can lead to withdrawal symptoms from the medication itself, including irritability, dysphoria, and insomnia. It is possible that venlafaxine use actually exacerbated cannabis withdrawal symptoms, leading people to use more cannabis than placebo to alleviate their discomfort. Mirtazapine, which increases serotonin and norepinephrine, has also failed to improve abstinence rates in people with cannabis use disorder.

People sometimes use cannabis to cope with their anxiety, and cannabis withdrawal can lead to symptoms of anxiety. Buspirone, a serotonin 5-HT_{1A} receptor partial agonist, has shown limited efficacy for treating anxiety in people with cannabis use disorder, though there may be better efficacy in males than in females. Fluoxetine, a selective serotonin reuptake inhibitor (SSRI), has failed to show efficacy in adolescents with both cannabis use disorder and depression. SSRIs are a class of antidepressants that are also used for the treatment of anxiety disorders, such as generalized anxiety disorder. Vilazodone, which has both SRI and 5-HT_{1A} receptor agonism properties, also failed to increase abstinence rates in people with cannabis use disorder.

Studies of valproate have found no significant benefit, though some studies have found mixed results. Baclofen, a GABA_{B} receptor agonist and antispasmodic medication, has been found to reduce cravings but without a significant benefit towards preventing relapse or improving sleep. Zolpidem, a GABA_{A} receptor positive allosteric modulator and "z-drug" medication, has shown some efficacy in treating insomnia due to cannabis withdrawal, though there is a potential for misuse. Entacapone was well tolerated and decreased cannabis cravings in a trial on a small number of patients. Topiramate, an antiepileptic drug, has shown mixed results in adolescents, reducing the volume of cannabis consumption without significantly increasing abstinence, with somewhat poor tolerability. Gabapentin, an indirect GABA modulator, has shown some preliminary benefit for reducing cravings and cannabis use.

The agonist substitution approach is one that draws upon the analogy of the success of nicotine replacement therapy for nicotine addiction. Dronabinol, which is synthetic THC, has shown benefit in reducing cravings and other symptoms of withdrawal, though without preventing relapse or promoting abstinence. Combination therapy with dronabinol and the α_{2}-adrenergic receptor agonist lofexidine have shown mixed results, with possible benefits towards reducing withdrawal symptoms. However, overall, the combination of dronabinol and lofexidine is likely not effective for the treatment of cannabis use disorder. Nabilone, a synthetic THC analogue, has shown benefits in reducing symptoms of withdrawal such as difficulty sleeping, and decreased overall cannabis use. Despite its psychoactive effects, the slower onset of action and longer duration of action of nabilone make it less likely to be abused than cannabis itself, which makes nabilone a promising harm reduction strategy for the treatment of cannabis use disorder. The combination of nabilone and zolpidem has been shown to decrease sleep-related and mood-related symptoms of cannabis withdrawal, in addition to decreasing cannabis use. Nabiximols, a combined THC and cannabidiol (CBD) product that is formulated as an oromucosal spray, has been shown to improve withdrawal symptoms without improving abstinence rates. Oral CBD has not shown efficacy in reducing the signs or symptoms of cannabis use, and likely has no benefit in cannabis use withdrawal symptoms. CB_{1} receptor antagonists such as rimonabant have been tested for utility in CUD. The CB_{1} receptor antagonist rimonabant has shown efficacy in reducing the effects of cannabis in users, but with a risk for serious psychiatric side effects.

Naltrexone, a μ-opioid receptor antagonist, has shown mixed results for cannabis use disorder—both increasing the subjective effects of cannabis when given acutely, but potentially decreasing the overall use of cannabis with chronic administration. N-acetylcysteine (NAC) has shown some limited benefit in decreasing cannabis use in adolescents, though not with adults. Lithium, a mood stabilizer, has shown mixed results for treating symptoms of cannabis withdrawal, but is likely ineffective. Quetiapine, an atypical antipsychotic, has been shown to treat cannabis withdrawal related insomnia and decreased appetite at the expense of exacerbating cravings. Oxytocin, a neuropeptide that the body produces, has shown some benefit in reducing the use of cannabis when administered intranasally in combination with motivational enhancement therapy sessions, though the treatment effect did not persist between sessions.

=== Barriers to treatment ===
Research that looks at barriers to cannabis treatment frequently cites a lack of interest in treatment, a lack of motivation and knowledge of treatment facilities, an overall lack of facilities, costs associated with treatment, difficulty meeting program eligibility criteria and transport difficulties.

=== Lower-risk cannabis use ===
Recommendations by the Lower-Risk Cannabis Use Guidelines (LRCUG) for strategies to reduce the risks associated with cannabis use include:

- Delaying use until after adolescence to lower the risk of cognitive impairment and dependence

- Avoiding high-potency cannabis to reduce the likelihood of Cannabis Use Disorder

- Limiting frequency of use

- Avoiding high-risk methods of consumption such as deep inhalation and combusted cannabis

- Avoid simultaneous substance use such as tobacco and alcohol to prevent compounding effects on health and dependence

== Epidemiology ==
According to the 2022 National Survey on Drug Use and Health, cannabis is one of the most widely used drugs in the world. Research by the Pew Research Center from 2012 claims 42% of the US population have claimed to use cannabis at some point. According to the 2019 National Survey on Drug Use and Health, 46% of U.S. adults say they have ever used cannabis. An estimated 9% of those who use cannabis develop dependence.

In the United States, cannabis is the most commonly identified illicit substance used by people admitted to treatment facilities. Most of these people were referred there by the criminal justice system. Of admittees, 16% either went on their own or were referred by family or friends.

Of Australians aged 14 years and over, 34.8% have used cannabis one or more times in their life.

In the European Union (data as available in 2018, information for individual countries was collected between 2012 and 2017), 26.3% of adults aged 15–64 used cannabis at least once in their lives, and 7.2% used cannabis in the last year. The highest prevalence of cannabis use among 15 to 64 years old in the EU was reported in France, with 41.4% having used cannabis at least once in their life, and 2.17% used cannabis daily or almost daily. Among young adults (15–34 years old), 14.1% used cannabis in the last year.

Among adolescents (15–16 years old) in a European school based study (ESPAD), 16% of students have used cannabis at least once in their life, and 7% (boys: 8%, girls: 5%) of students had used cannabis in the last 30 days.

Globally, 22.1 million people (0.3% of the world's population) were estimated to have cannabis dependence.

== Research ==
Medications such as SSRI antidepressants, mixed-action antidepressants, bupropion, buspirone, and atomoxetine may not be helpful as cannabis use disorder treatments, but the evidence is very weak and further research is required. THC preparations, gabapentin, oxytocin, and N-acetylcysteine also need more research to determine if they are effective as the evidence base is weak.

Heavy cannabis use has been associated with impaired cognitive functioning; however, its specific details are difficult to elucidate due to the potential use of additional substances by users and the lack of longitudinal studies.

== See also ==
- La Guardia Committee, the first in-depth study into the effects of cannabis.
- Medical cannabis
- Quitting smoking
