= Cannabis in Brazil =

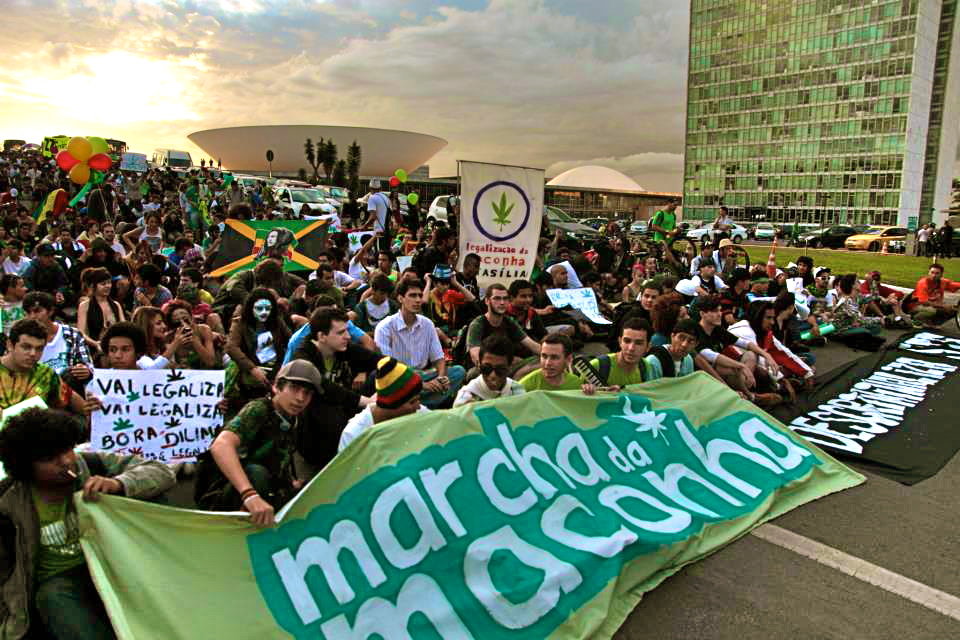
Marcha da Maconha, Brasília, 2013

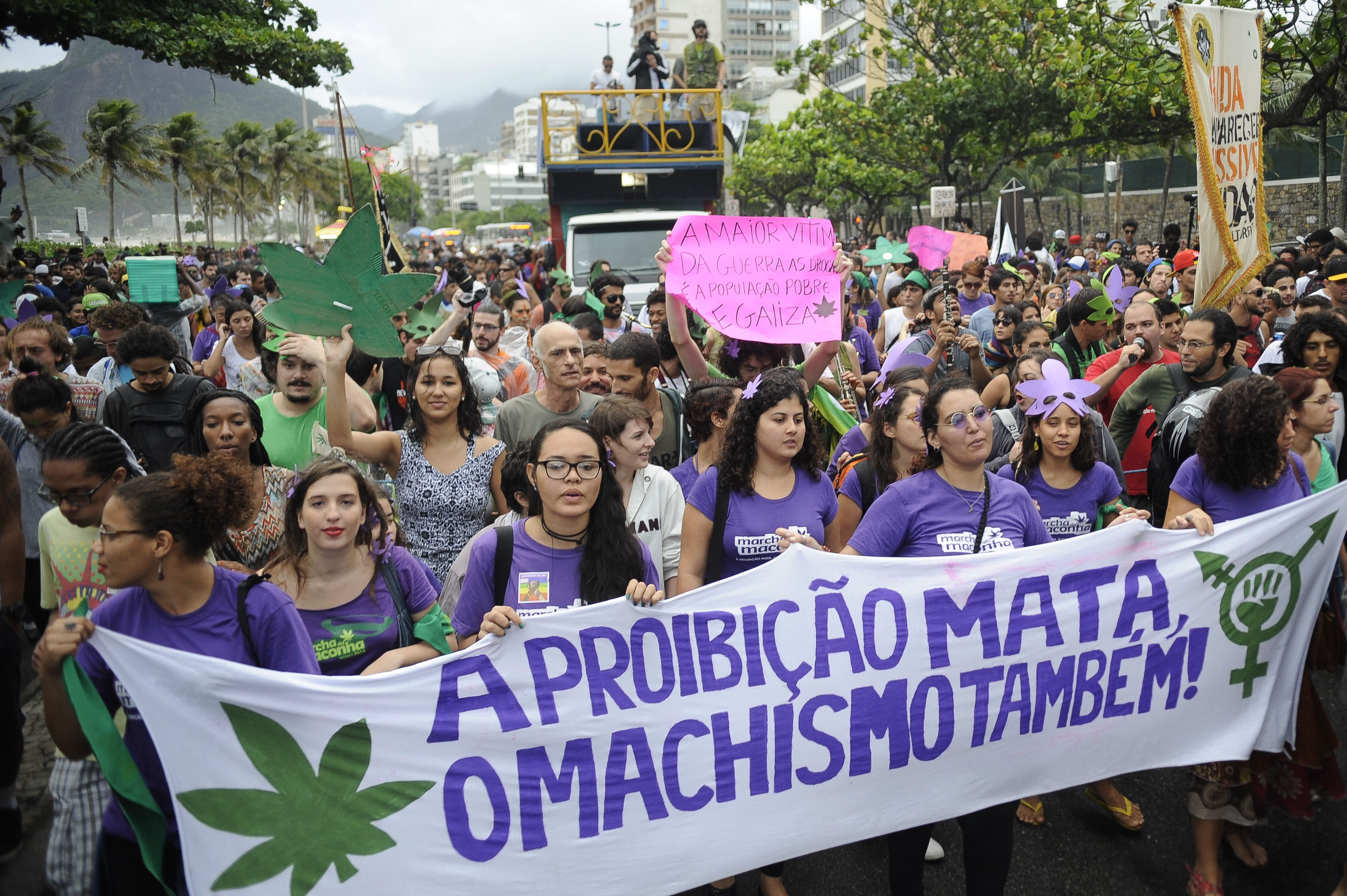
Marcha da Maconha, Rio de Janeiro, 2014

Cannabis in Brazil is illegal but decriminalized, while possession and cultivation of personal amounts and for private use were de-penalized in 2006. In 2024, Brazil's Supreme Court ruled that possession of cannabis for personal use (defined as being up to 40 grams) does not constitute a crime, though it remains illegal. However, the sale continues to be considered a crime. Use of cannabis medications is allowed for terminally ill patients or those who have exhausted other treatment options. It is also possible to import, manufacture and sell cannabis-based medicines.

== History ==
Cannabis was introduced to Brazil by the Portuguese colonists in the early 1800s. Their intent may have been to cultivate hemp fiber, but the slaves the Portuguese trafficked from Africa were familiar with cannabis and used it psychoactively, leading the Municipal Council of Rio de Janeiro in 1830 to prohibit bringing cannabis into the city, and punishing its use by any slave.

== Medical cannabis ==
Since 2015, cannabis medications greater than 0.2% THC can be prescribed for terminally ill patients or those who have exhausted other treatment options. Initially these medications could only be imported with special authorization from Anvisa, but in 2019 the rules were relaxed to allow pharmacy sales. Products less than 0.2% THC can be prescribed with less restriction.

In January 2017 Brazil issued its first license for a cannabis-based medicine, allowing sales of Mevatyl oral spray (internationally known as Sativex).

In March 2020, the State of Pernambuco issued the first national license for the homemade planting of marijuana for medicinal purposes.

== Enforcement ==
Since 2006, public use of cannabis entails a warning, community service and education on the effects of drug use. The same measures apply to public use of any illegal drug. However, there are reports of municipal guards applying extrajudicial punishment to civilian use of cannabis.

Selling, transportation, and trafficking of drugs are considered criminal acts and are punished with 5 to 15 years in prison and a significant fine.

In June 2024, the Supreme Federal Court decriminalized the possession of up to 40 g (1.4 oz) or up to 6 female plants. In practice, the Article 28 of the Drugs Law (Law no. 11343/2006) was ruled unconstitutional, converting penalties of prosecution and prison into an administrative offense.

== See also ==
- RE 635659 – Supreme Federal Court case on the decriminalization of drugs for personal use
