= Tetrahydrocannabinol/cannabinol/cannabidiol =

THC/CBN/CBD

- Tetrahydrocannabinol (THC) (top) and cannabidiol (CBD) (bottom)

Combination of
- Tetrahydrocannabinol: Cannabinoid
- Cannabinol: Cannabinoid
- Cannabidiol: Cannabinoid

Clinical data
- Trade names: Zenivol
- Other names: THC/CBN/CBD; ZTL-101; ZTL101
- Routes of administration: Sublingual
- Drug class: Cannabinoids; Cannabinoid receptor modulators

Tetrahydrocannabinol/cannabinol/cannabidiol (THC/CBN/CBD), sold under the brand name Zenivol and also known by its developmental code name ZTL-101, is a cannabinoid medication used for the treatment of insomnia. It is approved and marketed in Germany.

== Medical uses ==
THC/CBN/CBD is indicated for the management of insomnia. Clinical trials have shown that it improves time to sleep, reduces nighttime awakenings, increases total sleep time, and enhances sleep quality and feeling refreshed after sleep.

== Available forms ==
The drug is administered sublingually as a liquid using a syringe about 1 hour before bedtime. Each 0.5 mL dose contains 10 mg δ^{9}-tetrahydrocannabinol (THC), 1 mg cannabinol (CBN), and 0.5 mg cannabidiol (CBD), corresponding to a 20:2:1 mg/mL ratio. One or two doses are typically taken per night.

== Adverse effects ==
Reported side effects are generally mild and resolve upon waking. They include dry mouth, dizziness, headache, and "feeling abnormal".

== Pharmacology ==
=== Pharmacokinetics ===
The pharmacokinetics of the formulation have been investigated and described in clinical studies.

=== Pharmacodynamics ===
THC is a psychoactive cannabinoid acting as a CB_{1} and CB_{2} receptor partial agonist. CBN is a mildly psychoactive cannabinoid that also acts as a CB_{1} and CB_{2} receptor partial agonist. CBD does not act as an agonist at cannabinoid receptors but modulates the endocannabinoid system and other molecular targets. THC/CBN/CBD does not significantly alter sleep architecture, aside from a near-significant 3.5% reduction in REM sleep duration.

== History ==
THC/CBN/CBD was approved and launched as a pharmaceutical drug for insomnia in Germany in 2022. It was developed and is marketed by Zelira Therapeutics.

== See also ==
- Medical cannabis
- Tetrahydrocannabinol/cannabidiol
- Nabiximols
- Dronabinol
- Nabilone
