= Flezurafenib =

Clinical data
- Other names: JZP-815

Identifiers
- IUPAC name: 5-[[(3S)-3-[5-(4-fluorophenyl)-1H-imidazol-2-yl]-3,4-dihydro-2H-chromen-6-yl]oxy]-3,4-dihydro-1H-1,8-naphthyridin-2-one
- CAS Number: 2760321-00-2
- PubChem CID: 162772363
- IUPHAR/BPS: 13233
- UNII: P26TTM6U27
- KEGG: D13132

Chemical and physical data
- Formula: C_{26}H_{21}FN_{4}O_{3}
- Molar mass: 456.477 g·mol^{−1}
- 3D model (JSmol): Interactive image
- SMILES: C1CC(=O)NC2=NC=CC(=C21)OC3=CC4=C(C=C3)OC[C@@H](C4)C5=NC=C(N5)C6=CC=C(C=C6)F
- InChI: InChI=InChI=1S/C26H21FN4O3/c27-18-3-1-15(2-4-18)21-13-29-25(30-21)17-11-16-12-19(5-7-22(16)33-14-17)34-23-9-10-28-26-20(23)6-8-24(32)31-26/h1-5,7,9-10,12-13,17H,6,8,11,14H2,(H,29,30)(H,28,31,32)/t17-/m1/s1; Key:TWJSMWXWCWQPRO-QGZVFWFLSA-N

Flezurafenib is an investigational new drug that is being evaluated by Jazz Pharmaceuticals for the treatment of cancers that are driven by oncogenic mutations that activate the RAS-RAF-MAPK signaling pathway. It acts as a rapidly accelerated fibrosarcoma (RAF) kinase inhibitor. As of January 2025, flezurafenib has reached Phase 1 clinical trials, where it is being evaluated for the treatment of advanced solid tumors.
