= RE 635659 =

Case of the Supreme Court of Brazil

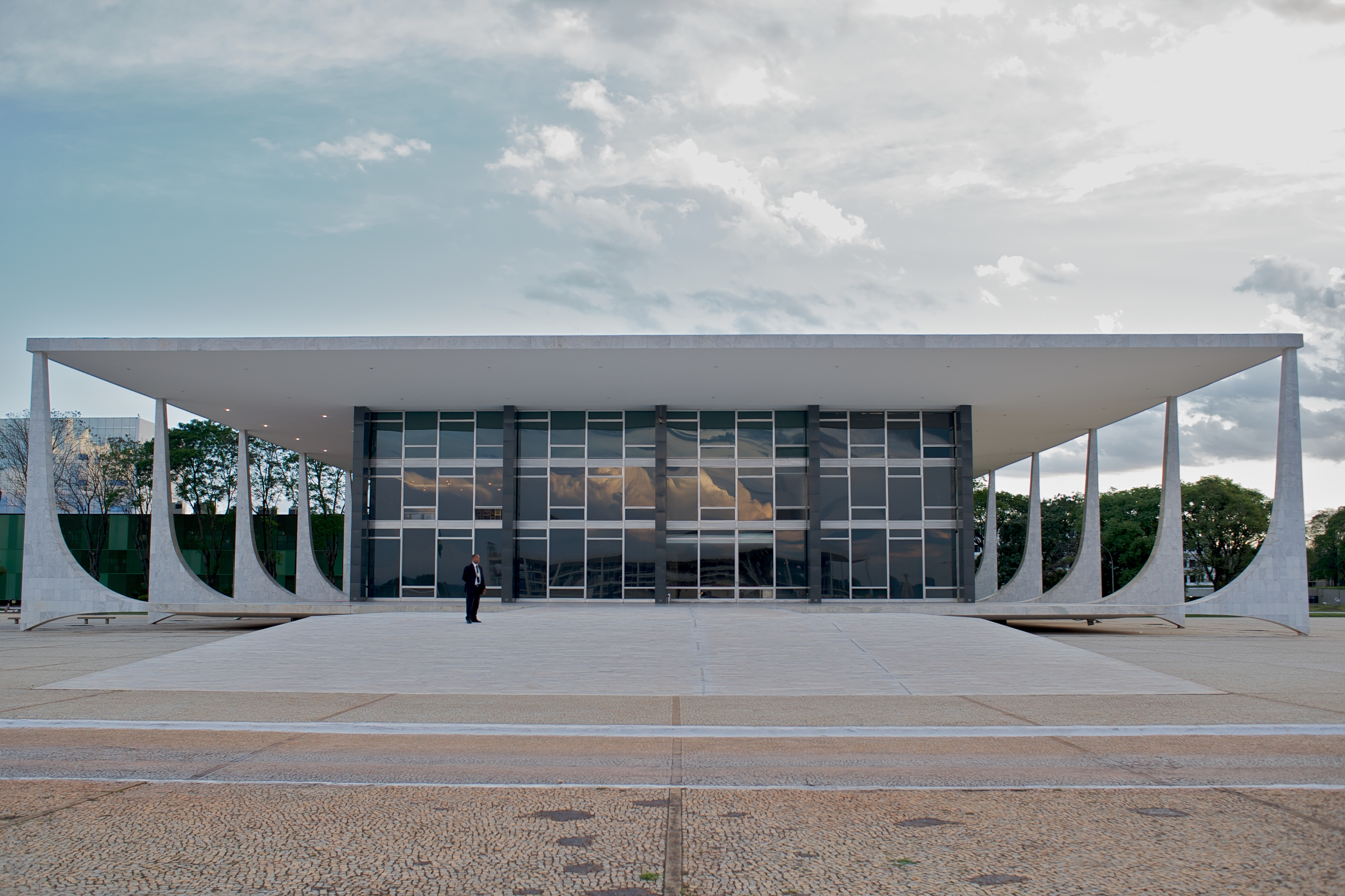
- Court: Supreme Federal Court
- Full case name: Recurso Extraordinário 635.659 (Francisco Benedito de Souza v. Ministério Público do Estado de São Paulo)
- Started: 20 August 2015 (10 years ago)
- Decided: 26 June 2024

Court membership
- Judges sitting: President Luís Roberto Barroso Justices: Edson Fachin; Luiz Fux; Cármen Lúcia; Nunes Marques; Gilmar Mendes; André Mendonça; Alexandre de Moraes; Dias Toffoli; Rosa Weber; Cristiano Zanin

Case opinions
- Decision by: Mendes
- Concurrence: Barroso, Fachin, Fux, Lúcia, Moraes, Toffoli, Weber
- Dissent: Marques, Mendonça, Zanin

Keywords
- Cannabis in Brazil; Latin American drug legalization

RE 635.659 was a case of the Supreme Court of Brazil concerning the decriminalization of drugs for personal use. The case's rapporteur, Gilmar Mendes, cast the initial vote in favor of decriminalization, and the majority of the Court agreed to decriminalize cannabis.

The case did not concern the legality of drugs themselves, but instead decided on two important topics: if drug possession constitutes a crime according to current law (an act that becomes part of the offender's criminal record), and what exactly distinguishes a drug user and a drug trafficker (which are different offenses, with different punishments).

The Court decided that possession of cannabis is not a criminal offense (though still illegal, and punishable by administrative sanctions). Additionally, the ministers decided on 40 grams (1.4 oz) as the quantity limit for classification as "possession for personal use"; quantities above that are considered trafficking.

The sale of any narcotics is not affected by this case and, as such, remains illegal. Furthermore, the Court's decision only concerned cannabis; possession of other narcotics remains a crime.

== Background ==
Legal status of cannabis possession for recreational use Legal Illegal but decriminalized Illegal but often unenforced Illegal Legality unknown

The case concerns the constitutionality of Article 28 of the Brazilian Antidrug Law (Law 11.343/2006), which criminalizes drug possession for personal use, although the crime is penalized only with warnings, community service and educational measures, instead of prison time or fines. Additionally, current legislation does not specify what amount constitutes personal use, so an offender is uncertain if they will be charged for trafficking instead.

The case was escalated to the Supreme Court after a man was caught in 2011 with 3 grams (0.11 oz) of cannabis inside a provisional detention center, and state courts sentenced him to 2 months of community service. The public defender argued consumption didn't constitute a crime, but the recourse was denied by the state attorney, and the case was brought to the Supreme Court on the federal level.

In 2015, opening the case as rapporteur, minister Gilmar Mendes cast the initial vote in favor of decriminalization of possession of drugs for personal use. Subsequently, ministers Edson Fachin and Roberto Barroso voted in favor of decriminalization of possession, but only for cannabis and not any other substances. Fachin proposed Congress pass legislation distinguishing personal use and trafficking; Barroso proposed 25 grams (0.88 oz) be the limit until Congress passes regulation.

In 2023, the Court reached a majority vote to request objective criteria differentiating drug users and traffickers. Ministers Rosa Weber and Alexandre de Moraes voted for decriminalization, with Moraes arguing for the limit of possession for personal use to fall between 25 grams (0.88 oz) and 60 grams (2.1 oz). Mendes amended his vote to also restrict decriminalization to just cannabis, and adopted Moraes' limit of 25 to 60 g. Cristiano Zanin voted to maintain the constitutionality of the law – and, therefore, voted against decriminalization – though he argues the Supreme Court should designate 25 g as the upper limit of possession for personal use.

On 30 September 2023, Rosa Weber retired as Supreme Court minister. Flávio Dino, Weber's successor to the court, should not be able to recast a vote in this case.

Voting in this case returned on 6 March 2024, with dissenting votes by ministers André Mendonça and Nunes Marques, both against decriminalization. However, the voting session was again interrupted as minister Dias Toffoli requested a review of the case, which postpones voting for at most 90 business days.

On 20 June 2024, Toffoli dissented, voting to maintain the constitutionality of the law. Toffoli, however, justifies the vote by arguing that the law already imposes only administrative sanctions, and not penal ones, to personal use. In effect, the minister argues, the law should not be considered unconstitutional, but instead interpreted as already not criminalizing personal use. Toffoli further states that declaring its unconstitutionality, or even deciding on a unique position for cannabis only, could bring repercussions to cases concerning the use of other narcotics.

Before voting resumed, on 25 June 2024, minister Toffoli requested to clarify his vote, stating "there's six votes for decriminalization", and "my vote is clear, in the sense that no user of any substance can be criminalized". That is, Toffoli's position, previously considered a dissenting vote (as well as a "third interpretation"), was clarified to be an agreement with the rapporteur that the personal use of drugs does not constitute a crime (while still being illegal). Additionally, Toffoli clarifies that his position is not limited to cannabis, but applies to any narcotic substance. Toffoli further considers that a strictly quantity-based distinction for personal use and trafficking might not be sufficient to deal with current issues of prejudice, but didn't offer an alternative.

Despite having already reached a concurring majority after Toffoli's vote, ministers Luiz Fux and Cármen Lúcia followed Toffoli's clarification by casting votes of their own. Fux and Lúcia followed Toffoli's reasoning that the law is not unconstitutional, but that it already doesn't criminalize possession or personal use, but instead considers them administrative illicit acts. Fux further argues that Anvisa should be responsible for establishing which substances, and their quantity limits, are safe for personal use. Lúcia, on the other hand, argues that, while Congress doesn't pass legislation regulating a quantity distinguishing drug users and traffickers, the Supreme Court should determine the criteria.

The rapporteur, minister Gilmar Mendes, emphasized that the Court was not legalizing any narcotics, and that personal drug use, even if not criminalized, would remain an illicit act – meaning it would still be punished, although not by prison time.

== High Court decision ==
On 26 June 2024, the Court reached a decision. The ministers decided that acquiring, storing, transporting or carrying cannabis for personal use does not constitute a crime, although it remains illegal, punishable by warnings on the negative effects of drug use and/or participation on socioeducational programs. If an offender is caught with the drug, it will still be seized by authorities, as it remains an illicit substance. The decision only applies to cannabis, and not any other narcotic.

Additionally, the Court decided that the limit for classification as "personal use" for cannabis is 40 grams (1.4 oz) or 6 female plants. (Note: The female sexual expression of Cannabis sativa is the one used for narcotic purposes.) Quantities above that are considered trafficking, which remains a crime.

Minister Roberto Barroso further clarified that the quantity limit for personal use is not the only differentiating factor: "Sometimes, if someone with 40 g also carries a weighing scale and sale records, they're evidently trafficking, they're a trafficker. So, 40 g is not an absolute. But someone who has been convicted without participating in a criminal organization, exclusively for having been caught with 40 g of weed, they can possibly ask for a revision of this conviction".

=== Judiciary representation ===
Supreme Court members	Ministers	Yes	No
Luís Roberto Barroso	1	1	
Edson Fachin	1	1	
Luiz Fux	1	1	
Cármen Lúcia	1	1	
Nunes Marques	1		1
Gilmar Mendes	1	1	
André Mendonça	1		1
Alexandre de Moraes	1	1	
Dias Toffoli	1	1	
Rosa Weber	1	1	
Cristiano Zanin	1		1
Total	11	08	03

== Aftermath ==
After the decision, both the Public Defender's Office and the Public Prosecutor's Office of São Paulo filed for recourses. The state's Public Defender's Office requested the court to:

- Invert the wording of the decision for cases in which someone is found with cannabis quantities over the limit; as is, it states the judge may decide there is no crime if there is an indication that the accused is just a user. The recourse claims this is an inversion of the burden of proof, and requests it be changed to instead require some indication that the accused is not a user, but instead had the intention to traffic the drug, before charging them with a crime.
- Clarify what the legal procedure is for cases of possession for personal use. According to the Office, while the decision states it won't be considered a crime, it doesn't specify whether it's a civil or administrative process.

On the other hand, the state's Public Prosecutor's Office requested the court to:

- Explicitly state the possession of other illicit substances is still criminally punishable, even for personal use.
- Clarify if the decision covers only cannabis as dry leaves used for smoking, or applies to any product derived from cannabis or containing THC as well.
- Clarify if the decision is retroactive to 2006, when the Antidrug Law was published, or only applies for future cases.
- Clarify if the Public Prosecutor's Office can participate in the review of previous cases taking place to revert punishments for activities that are no longer deemed criminal.

As the case's rapporteur, Gilmar Mendes voted to reject both recourses, stating the court's decision already sufficed for every complaint brought up, and the majority of the court agreed. In his rejection, Mendes clarified:

- The amount of cannabis is only meant be one of the parameters to be considered by the judge to decide whether it's a personal use or a trafficking case. As such, even when the amount is above the limit, Mendes says, judges "shouldn't automatically convict a defendant".
- The procedure for personal use cases will be regulated by the National Council of Justice; until then, cases will be decided by the Juizados Especiais Criminais.
- The case was brought to the court after an inmate was criminally charged for possession of 3 grams (0.11 oz) of cannabis. Consequently, the court dealt only with the criminal status of cannabis, and did not issue a decision on any other substances, including those derived from cannabis or containing THC. As such, the consumption of those remains a crime.
- The Public Prosecutor's Office may take part in the review of old cases.
- The decision is retroactive to previous cases.

== See also ==
- Cannabis in Brazil
- Latin American drug legalization
- Legality of cannabis
