= Journal of Cannabis Therapeutics =

- Discipline: Pharmacology
- Language: English

Publication details
- History: 1998–2003

Standard abbreviations
- ISO 4: J. Cannabis Ther.

Indexing
- ISSN: 1529-9775 (print); 1529-9783 (web)
- OCLC no.: 43973710

The Journal of Cannabis Therapeutics was a pharmacology journal that was founded in 1998 and lasted until 2003. Its editorial board included Geoffrey William Guy and Tod Mikuriya.

== See also ==
- Lester Grinspoon
