= National Survey on Drug Use and Health =

The National Survey on Drug Use and Health, often abbreviated NSDUH, is an annual nationwide survey on the use of legal and illegal drugs, as well as mental disorders, that has been conducted by the United States federal government since 1971. It is funded by the Substance Abuse and Mental Health Services Administration (SAMHSA), and is supervised by the SAMHSA's Center for Behavioral Health Statistics and Quality. The survey interviews about 70,000 Americans aged 12 and older, through face-to-face interviews conducted where the respondent lives. Web data collection methodology was implemented in 2020 due to the COVID-19 pandemic, and both web and face-to-face interviews are still used. In 1988, RTI International started conducting the survey, and they have been contracted by SAMHSA to continue doing so through 2017. It was originally called the Nationwide Study of Beliefs, Information, and Experiences (NSBIE), was renamed in 1977 to National Household Survey on Drug Abuse (NHSDA), and was finally renamed in 2002 with its current name. The NSDUH, along with the Monitoring the Future, is one of the two main ways the National Institute on Drug Abuse measures drug use in the United States.
