= Latin American drug legalization =

Legalization of drugs in Latin America

In the early 21st century, advocacy for drug legalization has increased in Latin America. Spearheading the movement, the Uruguayan government announced in 2012 plans to legalize state-controlled sales of marijuana in order to fight drug-related crimes.

== Argentina ==
In August 2009, the Supreme Court of Argentina declared in a landmark ruling that it was unconstitutional to prosecute citizens for having drugs for their personal use — "adults should be free to make lifestyle decisions without the intervention of the state". The decision affected the second paragraph of Article 14 of the country's drug control legislation (Law Number 23,737) that punishes the possession of drugs for personal consumption with prison sentences ranging from one month to two years (although education or treatment measures can substitute penalties). The unconstitutionality of the article concerns cases of drug possession for personal consumption that does not affect others.

== Brazil ==
In 2002 and 2006, the country went through legislative changes, resulting in a partial decriminalization of possession for personal use. Prison sentences no longer applied and were replaced by educational measures and community services. However, the 2006 law does not provide objective means to distinguish between users or traffickers. A disparity exists between the decriminalization of drug use and the increased penalization of selling drugs, punishable with a maximum prison sentence of 5 years for the sale of very minor quantities of drugs. Most of those incarcerated for drug trafficking are offenders caught selling small quantities of drugs, among them drug users who sell drugs to finance their drug habits.

== Colombia ==
In 2009, Colombia's Supreme Court ruled that possession of illegal drugs for personal use is not a criminal offense, citing a 1994 decision by the country's Constitutional Court. In 2012 Colombian President Juan Manuel Santos proposed the legalisation of drugs in an effort to counter the failure of the war on drugs, which was said to have yielded poor results at a huge cost.

== Ecuador ==
According to the 2008 Constitution of Ecuador, in its Article 364 the Ecuadorian state does not see drug consumption as a crime but only as a health concern. Since June 2013 the State drugs regulatory office CONSEP has published a table which establishes maximum doses carried by persons so as to be considered in legal possession.

== Guatemala ==
In 2012, newly elected Guatemalan president Otto Pérez Molina argued that all drugs should be legalized while attending the United Nations.

== Honduras ==
On February 22, 2008, Honduras President Manuel Zelaya called on the United States to legalize drugs, in order, he said, to prevent the majority of violent murders occurring in Honduras. Honduras is used by cocaine smugglers as a transition point between Colombia and the US. Honduras, with a population of 7 million suffers an average of 8–10 murders a day, with an estimated 70% being as a result of this international drug trade. The same problem is occurring in Guatemala, El Salvador, Costa Rica and Mexico, according to Zelaya.

== Mexico ==
In April 2009, the Mexican Congress approved changes in the General Health Law that decriminalized the possession of illegal drugs for immediate consumption and personal use, allowing a person to possess up to 5 g of marijuana or 500 mg of cocaine. The only restriction is that people in possession of drugs should not be within a 300-meter radius of schools, police departments, or correctional facilities. Opium, heroin, LSD, and other synthetic drugs were also decriminalized, it will not be considered as a crime as long as the dose does not exceed the limit established in the General Health Law. The law establishes very low amount thresholds and strictly defines personal dosage. For those arrested with more than the threshold allowed by the law this can result in heavy prison sentences, as they will be assumed to be small traffickers even if there are no other indications that the amount was meant for selling.

Cannabis in Mexico became legal for private, recreational use in June 2021, upon application and issuance of a permit from the health secretariat, COFEPRIS (Comisión Federal para la Protección contra Riesgos Sanitarios). On 29 June 2021, the Supreme Court of Mexico decriminalized the recreational use of cannabis. President Andrés Manuel López Obrador signed a bill that allows adults 18 and over to possess up to 28 grams of cannabis and grow up to six marijuana plants on their property.

== Uruguay ==
Uruguay is one of a few countries that never criminalized the possession of drugs for personal use. Since 1974, the law establishes no quantity limits, leaving it to the judge's discretion to determine whether the intent was personal use.

In June 2012, the Uruguayan government announced plans to legalize state-controlled sales of marijuana in order to fight drug-related crimes. The government also stated that they will ask global leaders to do the same.

On July 31, 2013, the Uruguayan House of Representatives approved a bill to legalize the production, distribution, sale, and consumption of marijuana by a vote of 50 to 46. Relating this vote to the 2012 legalization of marijuana by the U.S. states Colorado and Washington, John Walsh, drug policy expert of the Washington Office on Latin America, stated that "Uruguay's timing is right. Because of last year’s Colorado and Washington State votes to legalize, the U.S. government is in no position to browbeat Uruguay or others who may follow.”

On December 10, 2013, a government-sponsored bill approved by a 16–13 vote in the Senate provides for regulation of the cultivation, distribution and consumption of marijuana and is aimed at wresting the business from criminals in the small South American nation. Backers outside the court house paraded signs declaring, "Cultivating freedom, Uruguay grows." In April 2014, Uruguay became the first country to have legal recreational cannabis. Consumers were given the ability to buy a maximum of 40 grams (1.4 ounces) each month from licensed pharmacies as long as they are Uruguayan residents over the age of 18. Buyers were registered on a government database that monitors their monthly purchases. Uruguayans were given the ability to grow six marijuana plants in their homes per year and form clubs of 15 to 45 members that can grow up to 99 plants per year.

== See also ==
- Legality of cannabis
- Drug liberalization
- Illegal drug trade in Latin America
- International Narcotics Control Board
- United Nations Commission on Narcotic Drugs
- United Nations Convention Against Illicit Traffic in Narcotic Drugs and Psychotropic Substances
- United Nations Office on Drugs and Crime
