= Jazz Pharmaceuticals =

Irish tax-registered pharmaceutical corporation

Jazz Pharmaceuticals plc
- Type: Public
- Traded as: Nasdaq: JAZZ; S&P 400 component
- Industry: Biotechnology; Pharmaceutical
- Predecessor: Jazz Pharmaceuticals, Inc. (before the 2012 tax inversion to Ireland)
- Founded: 2003; 23 years ago in California, U.S.
- Headquarters: Dublin, Ireland
- Area served: Worldwide
- Key people: Bruce C. Cozadd (chairman and CEO)
- Products: Pharmaceutical drugs
- Brands: Xyrem; Erwinaze; Defitelio; FazaClo; FazaClo HD; Luvox CR; Prialt; Vyxeos
- Revenue: ▲US$3.83 billion (2023)
- Operating income: ▲US$579 million (2023)
- Net income: ▲US$415 million (2023)
- Total assets: ▲US$11.4 billion (2023)
- Total equity: ▲US$3.74 billion (2023)
- Number of employees: c. 2,800 (2023)
- Website: jazzpharma.com

Jazz Pharmaceuticals plc (a merger of Jazz Pharmaceuticals, Inc. and Azur Pharma plc) is an American global biopharmaceutical company with a focus on oncology and neuroscience. It was founded in 2003 in California, United States and is now headquartered in Dublin, Ireland.

One of the company's considerable products is the United States Food and Drug Administration (FDA) approved drug Xyrem (sodium oxybate), the sodium salt of the naturally occurring neurotransmitter γ-Hydroxybutyric acid (GHB). In 2017, net product sales of Xyrem were $1.187 billion, which represented 74% of the company's total net product sales. In 2019, Jazz was granted FDA-approval to market Sunosi with indications for treating excessive daytime sleepiness (EDS) in narcolepsy as well as obstructive sleep apnea (OSA). In 2022, it was announced that Axsome Therapeutics would be acquiring Sunosi from Jazz Pharmaceuticals.

In 2007, the company pled guilty to felony charges related to its illegal marketing of Xyrem for off-label use.

The company is also a member of the Pharmaceutical Research and Manufacturers of America (PhRMA).

== Company history and acquisitions ==
=== 2010–2019 ===
On 18 February 2010, the FDA accepted a new drug application for JZP-6 (Sodium oxybate) for the treatment of Fibromyalgia. In the following December, a new patent was issued for Sodium Oxybate.

On September 19, 2011, Jazz Pharmaceuticals merged with Irish Azur Pharma plc to form Jazz Pharmaceuticals plc. The Azur Pharma seat in Dublin became the headquarters of the combined company. Azur Pharma had been marketing specialty pharmaceutical products in the central nervous system (CNS) and women's health areas with US operations in Philadelphia.

On 26 April 2012, the company acquired EUSA Pharma for $650 million (plus $50 million in milestone payments). In September, the company sold its Women's Health business to Meda for $95 million. In December, the company began clinical trial of intravenous Erwinaze in patients with Acute Lymphoblastic Leukemia.

In January 2014, the company announced it would acquire the rare disease drug developer Gentium SpA and its lead product Defitelio for $1 billion.

In May 2016, the company announced it would acquire Alizé Pharma II for $20.5 million. At the end of the same month, the company announced its then largest acquisition, with the purchase of Celator Pharmaceuticals for $1.5 billion. As a result, Jazz obtained the rights to breakthrough therapy Vyxeos (liposomal daunorubicin and cytarabine) for treatment of acute myeloid leukemia.

In August 2019, the company announced it would acquire Cavion Inc. for up to $310 million.

=== 2020–present ===
In January 2021, Jazz announced it would acquire cannabis-focused medicinal drug company GW Pharmaceuticals for US$7.2 billion. This acquisition added the medication Epidiolex (cannabidiol), developed to treat severe epilepsy syndromes, to the company's portfolio.

In November 2025, Jazz Pharmaceuticals announced positive results from its Phase 3 trial for its cancer drug, Ziihera, a potential treatment for advanced gastroesophageal cancer.

=== Acquisition history ===
The following is an illustration of the company's mergers, acquisitions, spin-offs and historical predecessors:

- Jazz Pharmaceuticals
  - Jazz Pharmaceuticals PLC
    - Jazz Pharmaceuticals, Inc. (Merged 2011)
    - Azur Pharma PLC (Merged 2011)
  - EUSA Pharma (Acq 2012)
  - Gentium SpA (Acq 2014)
  - Alizé Pharma II (Acq 2016)
  - Celator Pharmaceuticals (Acq 2016)
  - Cavion Inc. (Acq 2019)
  - GW Pharmaceuticals (Acq 2021)
