= Nabiximols =

Specific cannabis extract

Nabiximols INN: Tetrahydrocannabinol Botanical Drug Substance

- Chemical structures of tetrahydrocannabinol (top) and cannabidiol (bottom)

Combination of
- Tetrahydrocannabinol: Cannabinoid
- Cannabidiol: Cannabinoid

Clinical data
- Trade names: Sativex
- Routes of administration: Oromucosal spray
- ATC code: N02BG10 (WHO)

Legal status
- Legal status: AU: S8 (Controlled drug); In general: ℞ (Prescription only)

Identifiers
- CAS Number: 56575-23-6
- PubChem CID: 44148067
- UNII: K4H93P747O
- CompTox Dashboard (EPA): DTXSID40972015

Canadian packaging of a case of Sativex vials

Nabiximols (USAN), sold under the brand name Sativex, is a specific Cannabis extract that was approved in 2010 as a botanical drug in the United Kingdom. Nabiximols is sold as a mouth spray intended to alleviate neuropathic pain, spasticity, overactive bladder, and other symptoms of multiple sclerosis; it was developed by the UK company GW Pharmaceuticals. In 2019, it was proposed that following application of the spray, nabiximols is washed away from the oral mucosa by the saliva flow and ingested into the stomach, with subsequent absorption from the gastro-intestinal tract. Nabiximols is a combination drug standardized in composition, formulation, and dose. Its principal active components are the cannabinoids: tetrahydrocannabinol (THC) and cannabidiol (CBD). Each spray delivers a dose of 2.7 mg THC and 2.5 mg CBD.

In 2003, GW Pharmaceuticals partnered with Bayer to market the drug under the brand name Sativex. In 2011, GW licensed the rights to commercialise nabiximols to Novartis for Asia (excluding China and Japan), Africa and the Middle East (excluding Israel).

== Availability ==
In June 2010, the Medicines and Healthcare products Regulatory Agency of the United Kingdom licensed nabiximols as a prescription-only medicine for the treatment of spasticity due to multiple sclerosis. This regulatory authorization represents the world's first full regulatory approval for the medicine. The spray is being marketed in the UK by Bayer Schering Pharma. Many people with MS cannot receive nabiximols due to local National Health Service (NHS) resistance to its funding; but, in August 2014, the NHS in Wales agreed to fund Sativex for people with multiple sclerosis.

Nabiximols was also approved in Spain for MS spasticity in the second half of 2010, and was launched in that country in March 2011. It was approved in the Czech Republic in April 2011, in Germany in May 2011, in Denmark in June 2011, and in Sweden in January 2012 to people with MS who have not responded adequately to other medication for spasticity. It has also been recommended for approval in Italy and Austria with formal approvals expected in these countries during 2011. In Spain and other European markets (excluding the UK), nabiximols will be marketed by Almirall.

In Canada, nabiximols has been approved by Health Canada for the treatment of MS spasticity. It has also received a licence with conditions (NOC/c) for two additional uses: as adjunctive treatment for the symptomatic relief of neuropathic pain in multiple sclerosis, and also for pain due to cancer.

Nabiximols is available in a number of countries as an unlicensed medicine, which enables doctors to prescribe the product to people who they consider may benefit. The product has been exported from the UK to a total of 28 countries to date.

In February 2007, GW and Otsuka Pharmaceutical announced an exclusive agreement for Otsuka to develop and market the drug in the United States. The first large scale US Phase IIb trial, Spray Trial, for people with cancer reported positive results in March 2010. GW and Otsuka have now commenced the Phase III development of nabiximols in cancer pain.

In December 2012, Sativex was approved in Poland.

In 2013, France legalized the use of cannabinoids in medicine, Sativex is the first one to be sold under prescription. Nevertheless, as of June 2016 this drug had still not actually been sold in pharmacies there.

== Effectiveness ==
Of the two preliminary Phase III studies investigating the treatment of people with MS, one showed a reduction of spasticity of 1.2 points on the 0–10 points rating scale (versus 0.6 points under placebo), the other showed a reduction of 1.0 versus 0.8 points. Only the first study reached statistical significance. The Phase III approval study consisted of a run-in phase where the response of individuals to the drug was determined. The responders (42% of subjects) showed a significant effect in the second, placebo controlled, phase of the trial. A 2009 meta-analysis of six studies found large variations of effectiveness, with a – statistically non-significant – trend towards a reduction of spasticity. A systematic review in 2014 by the American Academy of Neurology found that nabiximols was 'probably effective' for spasticity, pain, and urinary dysfunction, but wasn't supported for tremor. A 2021 study, however, showed "clinically relevant symptomatic results"

Nabiximols has also been studied for cancer pain resistant to opioids. While adjuvant use of nabiximols was safe in 3 trials for cancer pain, data regarding efficacy were mixed, and the drug failed to meet its primary endpoint for this purpose in its first Phase III trial.

== Side effects ==
In early clinical trials, nabiximols has generally been well tolerated. The most common adverse effects in Phase III trials were dizziness (25%), drowsiness (8%) and disorientation (4%); 12% of subjects stopped taking the drug because of the side effects. No investigations regarding the potential for dependence are available, but such a potential is unlikely considering the pharmacological properties of the two components. A systematic review has shown no evidence is available about the negative effect of Nabiximols on cognition ability

== Licensing ==
GW Pharmaceuticals were issued a license to cultivate cannabis for the manufacturing of Sativex in the United Kingdom (UK), granting them the sole legal right to research in aerosolized cannabis derived therapeutics, which became commercially viable in April 2013, when the UK Government scheduled the Sativex formulation to part IV of the UK Drugs Act.

== See also ==
- Medical cannabis
- Nabilone
- Dronabinol
- Zenivol
- Tetrahydrocannabinol/cannabidiol
- Hortapharm B.V.
