= Dronabinol =

Generic name of Δ9-THC in medicine

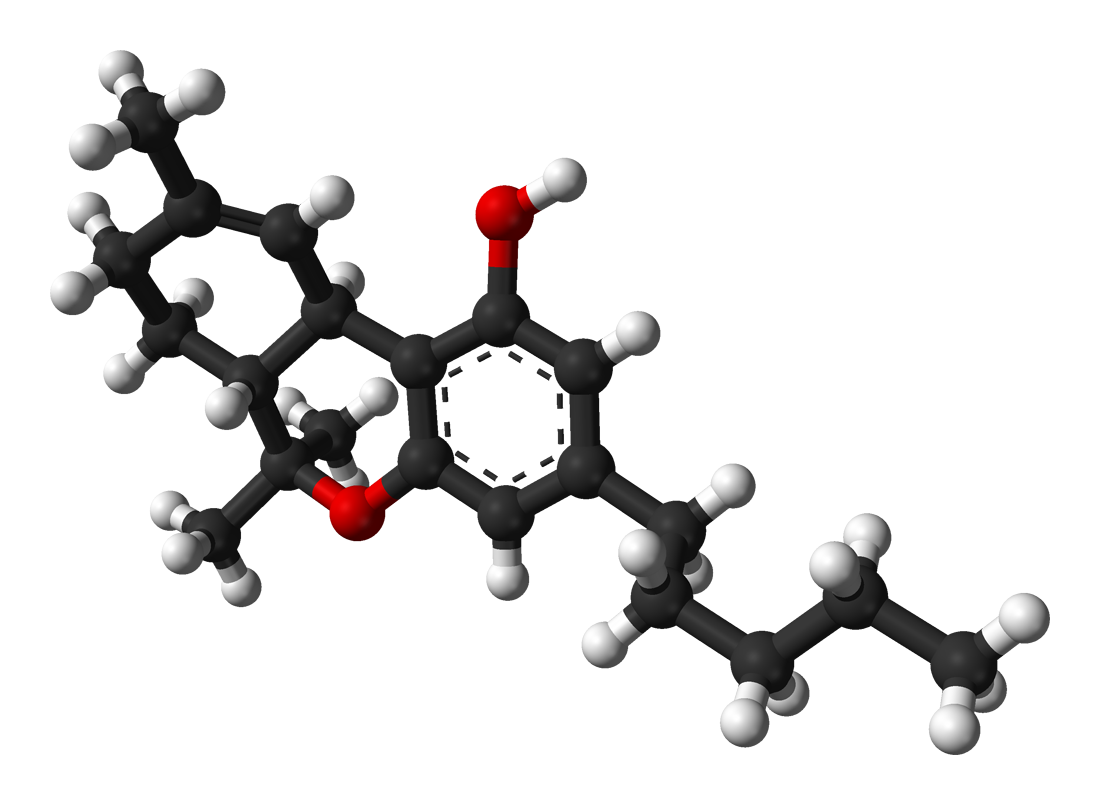

Clinical data
- Trade names: Marinol, Syndros
- Other names: (−)-trans-Δ^{9}-tetrahydrocannabinol
- License data: US FDA: Dronabinol
- Dependence liability: Physical: Low; Psychological: Low–moderate
- Addiction liability: Relatively low
- Routes of administration: By mouth
- Drug class: Cannabinoid
- ATC code: A04AD10 (WHO)

Legal status
- Legal status: US: Schedule II as Syndros, Schedule III as Marinol; SE: Förteckning II

Pharmacokinetic data
- Bioavailability: PO: 6–20%
- Onset of action: PO: 0.5–1 hour
- Elimination half-life: 25–36 hours
- Duration of action: PO: 4–6 hours

Identifiers
- IUPAC name: (6aR,10aR)-6,6,9-Trimethyl-3-pentyl-6a,7,8,10a-tetrahydro-6H-benzo[c]chromen-1-ol
- CAS Number: 1972-08-3
- PubChem CID: 16078
- IUPHAR/BPS: 2424
- DrugBank: DB00470
- ChemSpider: 15266
- UNII: 7J8897W37S
- KEGG: D00306
- ChEBI: CHEBI:66964
- ChEMBL: ChEMBL465

Chemical and physical data
- Formula: C_{21}H_{30}O_{2}
- Molar mass: 314.469 g·mol^{−1}
- 3D model (JSmol): Interactive image
- Specific rotation: −152° (ethanol)
- Boiling point: 155–157 °C (311–315 °F) 0.05mmHg, 157–160°C @ 0.05mmHg
- Solubility in water: 0.0028 mg/mL (23 °C)
- SMILES: CCCCCc1cc(c2c(c1)OC([C@H]3[C@H]2C=C(CC3)C)(C)C)O
- InChI: InChI=1S/C21H30O2/c1-5-6-7-8-15-12-18(22)20-16-11-14(2)9-10-17(16)21(3,4)23-19(20)13-15/h11-13,16-17,22H,5-10H2,1-4H3/t16-,17-/m1/s1; Key:CYQFCXCEBYINGO-IAGOWNOFSA-N

Dronabinol (INN), sold under the brand names Marinol and Syndros, is the generic name for the molecule of (−)-trans-Δ^{9}-tetrahydrocannabinol (THC) in the pharmaceutical context. It has indications as an appetite stimulant and antiemetic and is approved by the US Food and Drug Administration (FDA) as safe and effective for HIV/AIDS-induced anorexia and chemotherapy-induced nausea and vomiting.

Dronabinol is the principal psychoactive constituent enantiomer form, (−)-trans-Δ^{9}-tetrahydrocannabinol, found in Cannabis sativa L. plants, but can also be synthesized in the laboratory. Dronabinol does not include any other tetrahydrocannabinol (THC) isomers or any cannabidiol (CBD).

== Medical uses ==
=== Low appetite and nausea ===
Dronabinol is used to stimulate appetite and therefore weight gain in patients with HIV/AIDS and cancer. It is also used to treat chemotherapy-induced nausea and vomiting.

=== Pain ===
Dronabinol demonstrated analgesic efficacy in a majority of studies in chronic pain, the data in acute pain is less conclusive.

=== Cannabis use disorder ===
There is incomplete evidence for the utility of dronabinol in cannabis use disorder, but it does not appear to be effective.

=== Sleep apnea ===
Limited human studies suggest dronabinol may improve sleep apnea scores. Phase 2B clinical trials were completed in 2017 for FDA approval for this indication.

== Adverse effects ==
Common side effects of dronabinol include euphoria, drowsiness, dizziness, decreased motor coordination, anxiety, paranoia, confusion, and a rapid heartbeat, among others.

=== Overdose ===
In a mild overdose of dronabinol, the typical side effects are exacerbated, whereas a severe overdose presents with lethargy, slurred speech, severe ataxia, and orthostatic hypotension.

== History ==
While dronabinol was initially approved by the United States Food and Drug Administration (FDA) on May 31, 1985, it was not until May 13, 1986, the Drug Enforcement Administration (DEA), issued a Final Rule and Statement of Policy authorizing the "rescheduling of synthetic dronabinol in sesame oil and encapsulated in soft gelatin capsules from Schedule I to Schedule II" (DEA 51 FR 17476-78). This permitted medical use of Marinol, albeit with the severe restrictions associated with Schedule II status. For instance, refills of Marinol prescriptions were not permitted.

On April 29, 1991, the Commission on Narcotic Drugs, in accordance with article 2, paragraphs 5 and 6, of the Convention on Psychotropic Substances of 1971, decided that Δ^{9}-tetrahydrocannabinol (also referred to as Δ^{9}-THC) and its stereochemical variants should be transferred from Schedule I to Schedule II of that Convention. This released Δ^{9}-THC from many of the restrictions imposed by the convention, facilitating its marketing as medication.

An article published in the April–June 1998 issue of the Journal of Psychoactive Drugs found that "Healthcare professionals have detected no indication of script-chasing or doctor-shopping among the patients for whom they have prescribed dronabinol". The authors state that Marinol has a low potential for abuse.

In 1999, in the United States, Marinol was rescheduled from Schedule II to Schedule III of the Controlled Substances Act, reflecting a finding that dronabinol had a potential for abuse less than that of cocaine and heroin. This rescheduling constituted part of the argument for a 2002 petition for removal of cannabis from Schedule I of the Controlled Substances Act, in which petitioner Jon Gettman noted, "Cannabis is a natural source of dronabinol (THC), the ingredient of Marinol, a Schedule III drug. There are no grounds to schedule cannabis in a more restrictive schedule than Marinol". A liquid formulation of dronabinol (Syndros) received US FDA approval in July 2016 and was placed in Schedule II by the DEA in March 2017.

In 2003, the World Health Organization Expert Committee on Drug Dependence recommended transferring THC to Schedule IV of the convention, citing its medical uses and low abuse potential. In 2019, the Committee recommended transferring Δ^{9}-THC to Schedule I of the Single Convention on Narcotic Drugs of 1961, but its recommendations were rejected by the United Nations Commission on Narcotic Drugs.

== Society and culture ==
=== Brand names ===
Dronabinol is marketed as Marinol and Syndros, a registered trademark of Solvay Pharmaceuticals. Dronabinol is also marketed, sold, and distributed by PAR Pharmaceutical Companies under the terms of a license and distribution agreement with SVC pharma LP, an affiliate of Rhodes Technologies for Marinol and Insys Pharmaceuticals for Syndros. Dronabinol is available as a prescription drug (under Marinol and Syndros) in several countries including the United States, Germany, South Africa and Australia. In Canada, Tetra Bio-Pharma filed a New Drug Submission (NDS) with Health Canada for its Dronabinol Soft Gel capsules to be marketed as Reduvo. Tetra has two other dronabinol drugs with new routes of administration which limit first-pass metabolism; an inhaled THC-based dronabinol drug and their mucoadhesive-delivery dronabinol drug Adversa, which are both in the accelerated 505(b)(2) New Drug Application (NDA) pathway for the U.S. and Canadian markets.

In the United States, Marinol is a Schedule III drug, available by prescription, considered to be non-narcotic and to have a low risk of physical or mental dependence. Efforts to get cannabis rescheduled as analogous to Marinol have not succeeded thus far, though a 2002 petition has been accepted by the DEA. As a result of the rescheduling of Marinol from Schedule II to Schedule III, refills are now permitted for this substance. Marinol's U.S. Food and Drug Administration (FDA) approval for medical use has raised much controversy as to why cannabis is still illegal at the federal level.

== Comparisons with medical cannabis ==
Female cannabis plants not only contain THC but at least 113 other cannabinoids, including cannabidiol (CBD), thought to be the major anticonvulsant that helps people with multiple sclerosis; and cannabichromene (CBC), an anti-inflammatory which may contribute to the pain-killing effect of cannabis.

It takes over one hour for Marinol to reach full systemic effect, compared to seconds or minutes for smoked or vaporized cannabis. Mark Kleiman, director of the Drug Policy Analysis Program at UCLA's School of Public Affairs said of Marinol, "it wasn't any fun and made the user feel bad, so it could be approved without any fear that it would penetrate the recreational market, and then used as a club with which to beat back the advocates of whole cannabis as a medicine."

Clinical trials comparing the use of cannabis extracts with Marinol in the treatment of cancer cachexia have demonstrated equal efficacy and well-being among subjects in the two treatment arms. United States federal law currently registers dronabinol as a Schedule III controlled substance, but all other cannabinoids remain Schedule I, except various synthetic cannabinoids like nabilone and HU-308.

The FDA has recognized that there can be cannabinoid impurities in pharmaceutical dronabinol including cannabinol, Δ^{8}-tetrahydrocannabinol, isotetrahydrocannabinol, and Δ^{11}-tetrahydrocannabinol.

== See also ==
- Cannabinoids
  - 11-Hydroxy-THC, metabolite of THC
  - Anandamide, 2-Arachidonoylglycerol, endogenous cannabinoids
  - Tetrahydrocannabinol
  - Cannabidiol (CBD)
  - Cannabinol (CBN), a metabolite of THC
  - Dimethylheptylpyran
  - Parahexyl
  - Tetrahydrocannabinolic acid, the biosynthetic precursor for THC
  - HU-210, WIN 55,212-2, JWH-133, synthetic cannabinoid agonists (neocannabinoids)
- Medical cannabis (pharmaceutical cannabinoids)
  - Dronabinol/palmidrol
  - Epidiolex (prescription form of purified cannabidiol derived from hemp used for treating some rare neurological diseases)
  - Sativex (nabiximols)
  - Nabilone, a novel synthetic cannabinoid
  - HU-308, a highly potent synthetic cannabinoid CB_{2} receptor agonist
  - Zenivol (ZTL-101)
