= Medical cannabis =

Cannabis sativa L. (marijuana; hemp) used medicinally

Medical cannabis, medicinal cannabis or medical marijuana (MMJ) includes cannabis products and cannabinoid molecules that are prescribed by physicians for their patients. The use of cannabis as medicine has a long history, but has not been as rigorously tested as other medicinal plants due to legal and governmental restrictions, resulting in limited research to define the safety and efficacy of using cannabis to treat diseases.

There is mixed and inconclusive evidence on the benefits of cannabis-based medicines, frequent mild adverse effects, and generally low-to-moderate quality of evidence. Cannabis-based medicines may offer modest relief for chronic, especially neuropathic, pain and slight improvements in function and sleep in chronic pain patients, but evidence is limited and inconsistent; mild harms may outweigh the benefit and placebo effects may influence trial outcomes. Recent clinical reviews have concluded that evidence remains insufficient to support the use of cannabis or cannabinoids for most medical indications, emphasizing that modest potential benefits must be weighed against established risks.

Short-term use increases the risk of minor and major adverse effects. Common side effects include dizziness, feeling tired, vomiting, and hallucinations. Long-term effects of cannabis are not clear. Concerns include memory and cognition problems, risk of addiction, schizophrenia in young people, and the risk of children taking it by accident.

Many cultures have used cannabis for therapeutic purposes for thousands of years. Some American medical organizations have requested removal of cannabis from the list of Schedule I controlled substances, emphasizing that rescheduling would enable more extensive research and regulatory oversight to ensure safe access. Others oppose its legalization, such as the American Academy of Pediatrics. Countries that allow the medical use of whole-plant cannabis include Argentina, Australia, Canada, Chile, Colombia, Germany, Greece, Israel, Italy, the Netherlands, Peru, Poland, Portugal, Spain, and Uruguay. In the United States, 38 states and the District of Columbia have legalized cannabis for medical purposes, beginning with the passage of California's Proposition 215 in 1996.

== Classification ==
In the U.S., the National Institute on Drug Abuse defines medical cannabis as "using the whole, unprocessed marijuana plant or its basic extracts to treat symptoms of illness and other conditions".

A cannabis plant includes more than 400 different chemicals, of which about 70 are cannabinoids. In comparison, typical government-approved medications contain only one or two chemicals. The number of active chemicals in cannabis is one reason why treatment with cannabis is difficult to classify and study.

A 2014 review stated that the variations in ratio of CBD-to-THC in botanical and pharmaceutical preparations determines the therapeutic vs psychoactive effects (CBD attenuates THC's psychoactive effects) of cannabis products.

== Medical uses and research ==
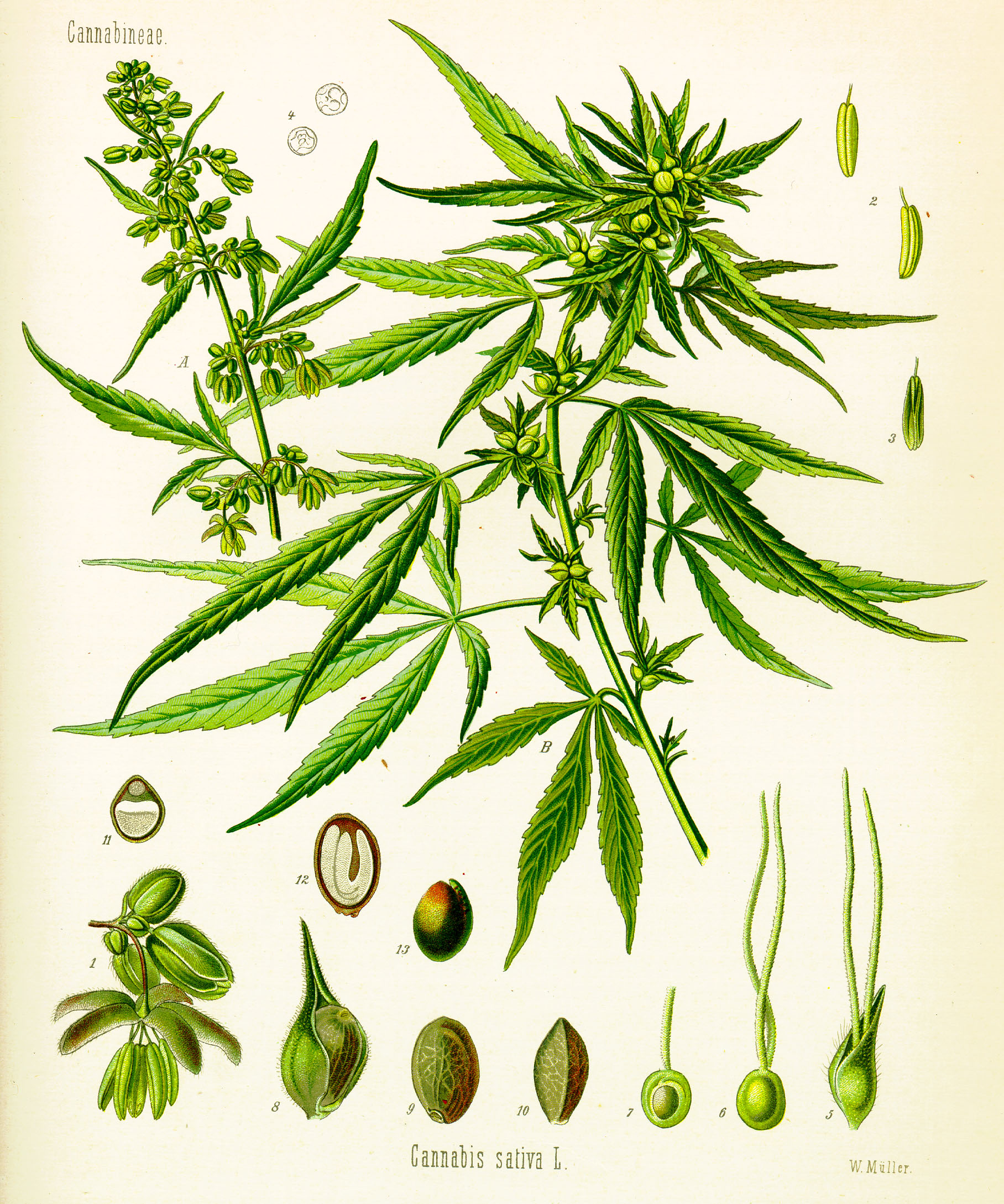
Cannabis as illustrated in Köhler's Book of Medicinal Plants, 1897

A scoping review of 72 systematic reviews found mixed and inconclusive evidence on the benefits of cannabis-based medicines, frequent mild adverse effects, and generally low-to-moderate quality of evidence.

Low quality evidence suggests its use for reducing nausea during chemotherapy, improving appetite in HIV/AIDS, improving sleep, and improving tics in Tourette syndrome. When usual treatments are ineffective, cannabinoids have also been recommended for anorexia, arthritis, glaucoma.

It is unclear whether American states might be able to mitigate the adverse effects of the opioid epidemic by prescribing medical cannabis as an alternative pain management drug.

Cannabis should not be used in pregnancy.

=== Pain ===
Cannabis-based medicines may provide modest relief for chronic pain, particularly neuropathic pain, as well as small improvements in physical function and sleep in chronic pain patients. Cannabis-based medicines show limited and inconsistent evidence for pain relief, with mild harms commonly reported that may outweigh potential benefits.

Short-term use of oral or sublingual cannabis, particularly high-THC synthetic or comparable-THC extracted products, may modestly reduce chronic pain but increases risks of dizziness, sedation, and other adverse effects, with limited evidence on long-term outcomes.

Placebo effects contribute to pain reduction in cannabinoid clinical trials, and while media attention is high, it does not directly correlate with clinical outcomes but may influence future expectations and trial results.

=== Insomnia ===
Cannabis administration does not have a noted effect on sleep. Cannabis withdrawal is associated with a reduction in hours spent asleep, an increase in the duration of sleep onset, and rapid eye movement rebounds.

=== Nausea and vomiting ===
Medical cannabis is somewhat effective in chemotherapy-induced nausea and vomiting (CINV) and may be a reasonable option in those who do not improve following preferential treatment. Comparative studies have found cannabinoids to be more effective than some conventional antiemetics such as prochlorperazine, promethazine, and metoclopramide in controlling CINV, but these are used less frequently because of side effects including dizziness, dysphoria, and hallucinations. Long-term cannabis use may cause nausea and vomiting, a condition known as cannabinoid hyperemesis syndrome (CHS).

A 2016 Cochrane review said that cannabinoids were "probably effective" in treating chemotherapy-induced nausea in children, but with a high side-effect profile (mainly drowsiness, dizziness, altered moods, and increased appetite). Less common side effects were "ocular problems, orthostatic hypotension, muscle twitching, pruritus, vagueness, hallucinations, lightheadedness and dry mouth".

=== HIV/AIDS ===
Evidence is lacking for both efficacy and safety of cannabis and cannabinoids in treating patients with HIV/AIDS or for anorexia associated with AIDS. As of 2013, current studies suffer from the effects of bias, small sample size, and lack of long-term data.

=== Neurological conditions ===
Cannabis' efficacy is not clear in treating neurological problems, including multiple sclerosis (MS) and movement problems. Evidence also suggests that oral cannabis extract is effective for reducing patient-centered measures of spasticity. A trial of cannabis is deemed to be a reasonable option if other treatments have not been effective. Its use for MS is approved in ten countries. A 2012 review found no problems with tolerance, abuse, or addiction. In the United States, cannabidiol, one of the cannabinoids found in the marijuana plant, has been approved for treating two severe forms of epilepsy, Lennox–Gastaut syndrome and Dravet syndrome.

=== Mental health ===
Evidence for cannabis and cannabinoids in mental health treatment is limited and low-quality; they show no benefit for most mental disorders, increase general adverse events, and are not justified for routine use. Risks (including cannabis-induced psychotic disorder, worsening bipolar symptoms, and cannabis use disorder) are substantial, especially in vulnerable populations.

The relationship between cannabis use and anxiety symptoms is complex, and while some users report relief, the overall evidence from observational studies and clinical trials remains inconclusive.

Cannabis use, especially at high doses, is associated with a higher risk of psychosis, particularly in individuals with a genetic predisposition to psychotic disorders like schizophrenia. Some studies have shown that cannabis can trigger a temporary psychotic episode, which may increase the risk of developing a psychotic disorder later.

The impact of cannabis on depression is less clear. Some studies suggest a potential increase in depression risk among adolescents who use cannabis, though findings are inconsistent across studies.

== Adverse effects ==
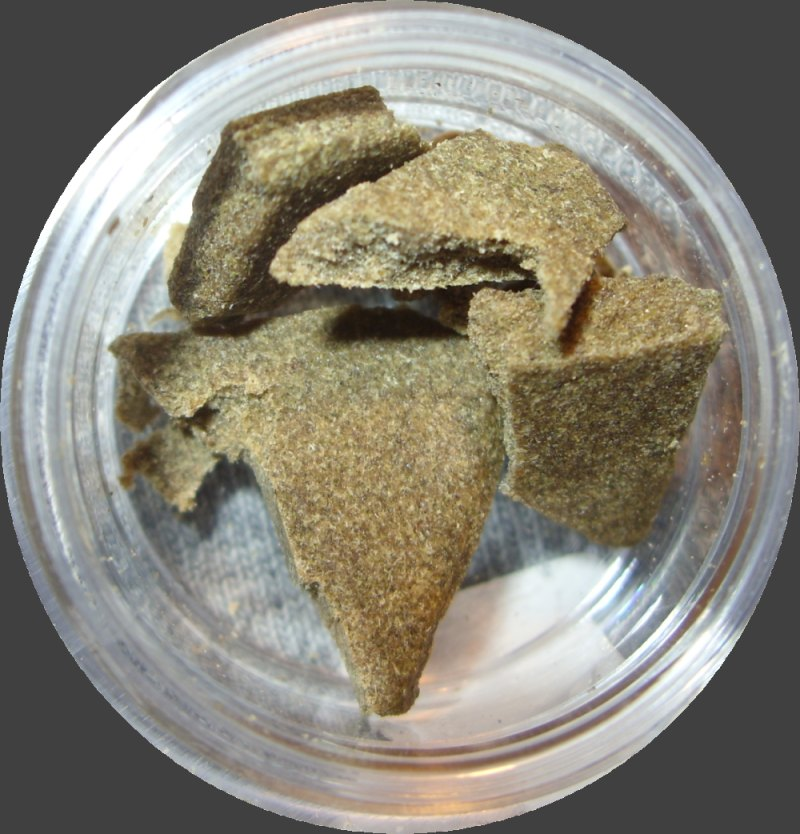
American medical hashish

=== Medical use ===
There is insufficient data to draw strong conclusions about the safety of medical cannabis. Typically, adverse effects of medical cannabis use are not serious; they include tiredness, dizziness, increased appetite, and cardiovascular and psychoactive effects. Other effects can include impaired short-term memory; impaired motor coordination; altered judgment; and paranoia or psychosis at high doses. Tolerance to these effects develops over a period of days or weeks. The amount of cannabis normally used for medicinal purposes is not believed to cause any permanent cognitive impairment in adults, though long-term treatment in adolescents should be weighed carefully as they are more susceptible to these impairments. Withdrawal symptoms are rarely a problem with controlled medical administration of cannabinoids. The ability to drive vehicles or to operate machinery may be impaired until a tolerance is developed. Although supporters of medical cannabis say that it is safe, further research is required to assess the long-term safety of its use.

=== Cognitive effects ===
Recreational use of cannabis is associated with cognitive deficits, especially for those who begin to use cannabis in adolescence. As of 2021 there is a lack of research into long-term cognitive effects of medical use of cannabis, but one 12-month observational study reported that "MC patients demonstrated significant improvements on measures of executive function and clinical state over the course of 12 months".

=== Impact on psychosis ===
Exposure to THC can cause cannabis-induced psychotic disorder (CIPD) in healthy individuals and people susceptible to schizophrenia.

A 2007 meta analysis concluded that cannabis use reduced the average age of onset of psychosis by 2.7 years relative to non-cannabis use. A 2005 meta analysis concluded that adolescent use of cannabis increases the risk of psychosis, and that the risk is dose-related. A 2004 literature review on the subject concluded that cannabis use is associated with a two-fold increase in the risk of psychosis, but that cannabis use is "neither necessary nor sufficient" to cause psychosis. A French review from 2009 came to a conclusion that cannabis use, particularly that before age 15, was a factor in the development of schizophrenic disorders. A 2026 meta-analysis linked cannabis use to an earlier age of psychosis onset.

== Pharmacology ==
The genus Cannabis contains two species which produce useful amounts of psychoactive cannabinoids: Cannabis indica and Cannabis sativa, which are listed as Schedule I medicinal plants in the US; a third species, Cannabis ruderalis, has few psychogenic properties. Cannabis contains more than 460 compounds; at least 80 of these are cannabinoids – chemical compounds that interact with cannabinoid receptors in the brain. As of 2012, more than 20 cannabinoids were being studied by the U.S. FDA.

The most psychoactive cannabinoid found in the cannabis plant is tetrahydrocannabinol (or delta-9-tetrahydrocannabinol, commonly known as THC). Other cannabinoids include delta-8-tetrahydrocannabinol, cannabidiol (CBD), cannabinol (CBN), cannabicyclol (CBL), cannabichromene (CBC) and cannabigerol (CBG); they have less psychotropic effects than THC, but may play a role in the overall effect of cannabis. The most studied are THC, CBD and CBN.

CB1 and CB2 are the primary cannabinoid receptors responsible for several of the effects of cannabinoids, although other receptors may play a role as well. Both belong to a group of receptors called G protein-coupled receptors (GPCRs). CB1 receptors are found in very high levels in the brain and are thought to be responsible for psychoactive effects. CB2 receptors are found peripherally throughout the body and are thought to modulate pain and inflammation.

=== Absorption ===
Cannabinoid absorption is dependent on its route of administration.

Inhaled and vaporized THC have similar absorption profiles to smoked THC, with a bioavailability ranging from 10 to 35%. Oral administration has the lowest bioavailability of approximately 6%, variable absorption depending on the vehicle used, and the longest time to peak plasma levels (2 to 6 hours) compared to smoked or vaporized THC.

Similar to THC, CBD has poor oral bioavailability, approximately 6%. The low bioavailability is largely attributed to significant first-pass metabolism in the liver and erratic absorption from the gastrointestinal tract. However, oral administration of CBD has a faster time to peak concentrations (2 hours) than THC.

Due to the poor bioavailability of oral preparations, alternative routes of administration have been studied, including sublingual and rectal. These alternative formulations maximize bioavailability and reduce first-pass metabolism. Sublingual administration in rabbits yielded bioavailability of 16% and time to peak concentration of 4 hours. Rectal administration in monkeys doubled bioavailability to 13.5% and achieved peak blood concentrations within 1 to 8 hours after administration.

=== Distribution ===
Like cannabinoid absorption, distribution is also dependent on route of administration. Smoking and inhalation of vaporized cannabis have better absorption than do other routes of administration, and therefore also have more predictable distribution. THC is highly protein bound once absorbed, with only 3% found unbound in the plasma. It distributes rapidly to highly vascularized organs such as the heart, lungs, liver, spleen, and kidneys, as well as to various glands. Low levels can be detected in the brain, testes, and unborn fetuses, all of which are protected from systemic circulation via barriers. THC further distributes into fatty tissues a few days after administration due to its high lipophilicity, and is found deposited in the spleen and fat after redistribution.

=== Metabolism ===
Delta-9-THC is the primary molecule responsible for the effects of cannabis. Delta-9-THC is metabolized in the liver and turns into 11-OH-THC. 11-OH-THC is the first metabolic product in this pathway. Both Delta-9-THC and 11-OH-THC are psychoactive. The metabolism of THC into 11-OH-THC plays a part in the heightened psychoactive effects of edible cannabis.

Next, 11-OH-THC is metabolized in the liver into 11-COOH-THC, which is the second metabolic product of THC. 11-COOH-THC is not psychoactive.

Ingestion of edible cannabis products lead to a slower onset of effect than the inhalation of it because the THC travels to the liver first through the blood before it travels to the rest of the body. Inhaled cannabis can result in THC going directly to the brain, where it then travels from the brain back to the liver in recirculation for metabolism. Eventually, both routes of metabolism result in the metabolism of psychoactive THC to inactive 11-COOH-THC.

=== Excretion ===
Due to substantial metabolism of THC and CBD, their metabolites are excreted mostly via feces, rather than by urine. After delta-9-THC is hydroxylated into 11-OH-THC via CYP2C9, CYP2C19, and CYP3A4, it undergoes phase II metabolism into more than 30 metabolites, a majority of which are products of glucuronidation. Approximately 65% of THC is excreted in feces and 25% in the urine, while the remaining 10% is excreted by other means. The terminal half-life of THC is 25 to 36 hours, whereas for CBD it is 18 to 32 hours.

CBD is hydroxylated by P450 liver enzymes into 7-OH-CBD. Its metabolites are products of primarily CYP2C19 and CYP3A4 activity, with potential activity of CYP1A1, CYP1A2, CYP2C9, and CYP2D6. Similar to delta-9-THC, a majority of CBD is excreted in feces and some in the urine. The terminal half-life is approximately 18–32 hours.

== Administration ==
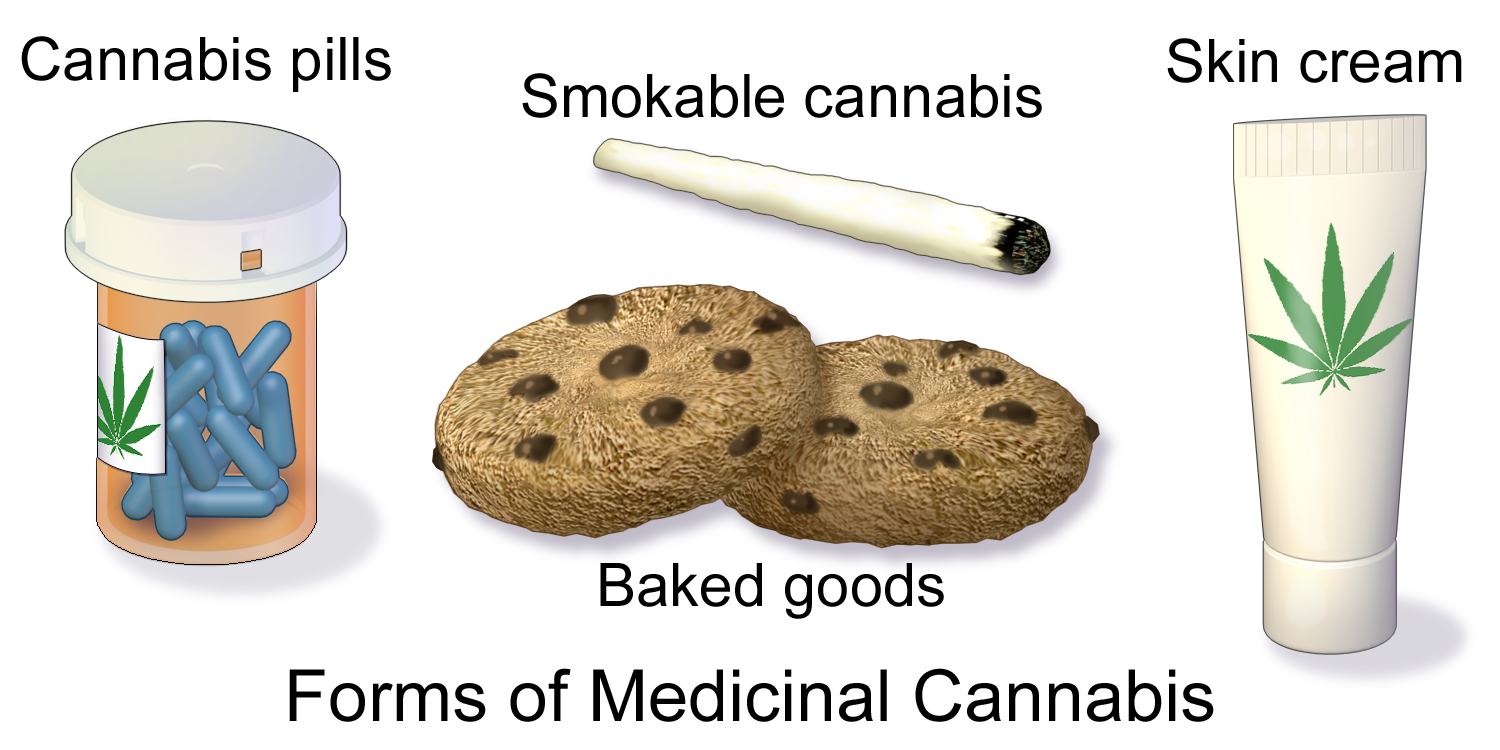
Illustrating various forms of medicinal cannabis

Smoking has been the means of administration of cannabis for many users, but it is not suitable for the use of cannabis as a medicine. It was the most common method of medical cannabis consumption in the US as of 2013. It is difficult to predict the pharmacological response to cannabis because concentration of cannabinoids varies widely, as there are different ways of preparing it for consumption (smoked, applied as oils, eaten, infused into other foods, or drunk) and a lack of production controls. The potential for adverse effects from smoke inhalation makes smoking a less viable option than oral preparations. Cannabis vaporizers have gained popularity because of a perception among users that fewer harmful chemicals are ingested when components are inhaled via aerosol rather than smoke. Cannabinoid medicines are available in pill form (dronabinol and nabilone) and liquid extracts formulated into an oromucosal spray (nabiximols). Oral preparations are "problematic due to the uptake of cannabinoids into fatty tissue, from which they are released slowly, and the significant first-pass liver metabolism, which breaks down Δ9THC and contributes further to the variability of plasma concentrations".

The US Food and Drug Administration (FDA) has not approved smoked cannabis for any condition or disease, as it deems that evidence is lacking concerning safety and efficacy. The FDA issued a 2006 advisory against smoked medical cannabis stating: "marijuana has a high potential for abuse, has no currently accepted medical use in treatment in the United States, and has a lack of accepted safety for use under medical supervision."

== History ==
=== Ancient ===
Cannabis, called má 麻 (meaning "hemp; cannabis; numbness") or dàmá 大麻 (with "big; great") in Chinese, was used in Taiwan for fiber starting about 10,000 years ago. The botanist Hui-lin Li wrote that in China, "The use of Cannabis in medicine was probably a very early development. Since ancient humans used hemp seed as food, it was quite natural for them to also discover the medicinal properties of the plant." Emperor Shen-Nung, who was also a pharmacologist, wrote a book on treatment methods in 2737 BCE that included the medical benefits of cannabis. He recommended the substance for many ailments, including constipation, gout, rheumatism, and absent-mindedness. Cannabis is one of the 50 "fundamental" herbs in traditional Chinese medicine.

The Ebers Papyrus (c. 1550 BCE) from Ancient Egypt describes medical cannabis. The ancient Egyptians used hemp (cannabis) in suppositories for relieving the pain of hemorrhoids.

Surviving texts from ancient India confirm that cannabis' psychoactive properties were recognized, and doctors used it for treating a variety of illnesses and ailments, including insomnia, headaches, gastrointestinal disorders, and pain, including during childbirth.

The Ancient Greeks used cannabis to dress wounds and sores on their horses, and in humans, dried leaves of cannabis were used to treat nose bleeds, and cannabis seeds were used to expel tapeworms.

In the medieval Islamic world, Arabic physicians made use of the diuretic, antiemetic, antiepileptic, anti-inflammatory, analgesic and antipyretic properties of Cannabis sativa, and used it extensively as medication from the 8th to 18th centuries.

=== Landrace strains ===
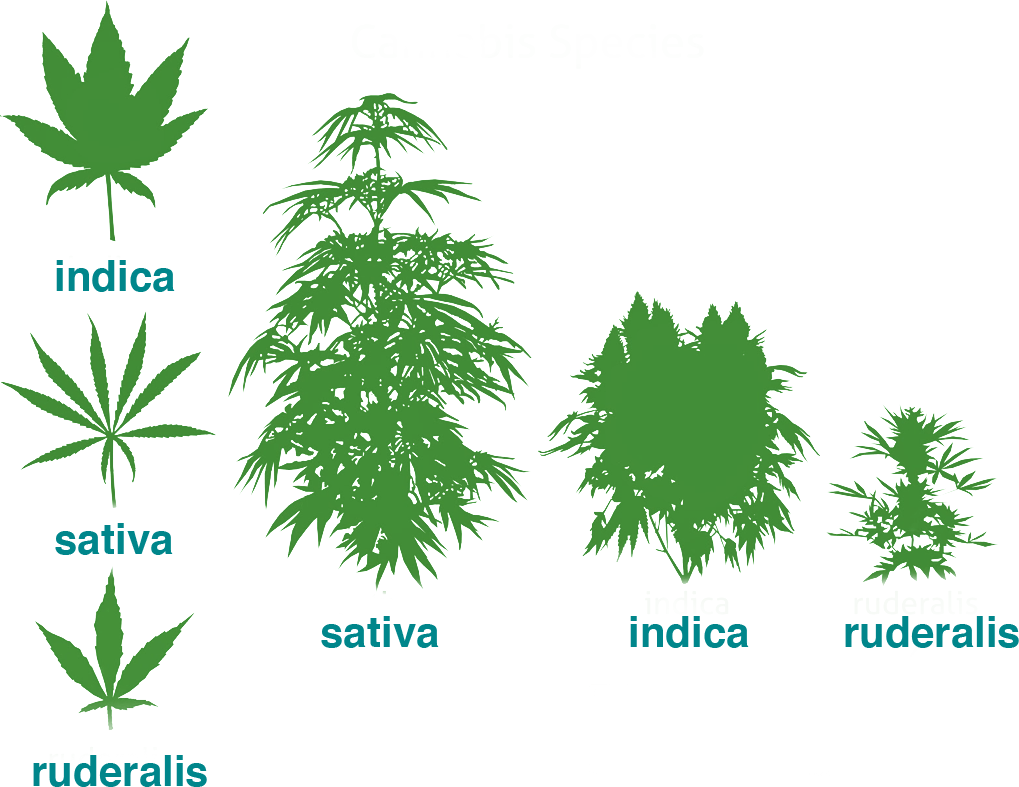
Evolution of cultivated cannabis strains. The cultivar, Cannabis ruderalis, still grows wild today.

Cannabis seeds may have been used for food, rituals or religious practices in ancient Europe and China. Harvesting the plant led to the spread of cannabis throughout Eurasia about 10,000 to 5,000 years ago, with further distribution to the Middle East and Africa about 2,000 to 500 years ago. A landrace strain of cannabis developed over centuries. They are cultivars of the plant that originated in one specific region.

Widely cultivated strains of cannabis, such as "Afghani" or "Hindu Kush", are indigenous to the Pakistan and Afghanistan regions, while "Durban Poison" is native to Africa. There are approximately 16 landrace strains of cannabis identified from Pakistan, Jamaica, Africa, Mexico, Central America and Asia.

=== Modern ===
An Irish physician, William Brooke O'Shaughnessy, is credited with introducing cannabis to Western medicine. O'Shaughnessy discovered cannabis in the 1830s while living abroad in India, where he conducted numerous experiments investigating the drug's medical utility (noting in particular its analgesic and anticonvulsant effects). He returned to England with a supply of cannabis in 1842, after which its use spread through Europe and the United States. In 1845 French physician Jacques-Joseph Moreau published a book about the use of cannabis in psychiatry. In 1850 cannabis was entered into the United States Pharmacopeia. An anecdotal report of Cannabis indica as a treatment for tetanus appeared in Scientific American in 1880.

The use of cannabis in medicine began to decline by the end of the 19th century, due to difficulty in controlling dosages and the rise in popularity of synthetic and opium-derived drugs. Also, the advent of the hypodermic syringe allowed these drugs to be injected for immediate effect, in contrast to cannabis which is not water-soluble and therefore cannot be injected.

In the United States, the medical use of cannabis further declined with the passage of the Marihuana Tax Act of 1937, which imposed new regulations and fees on physicians prescribing cannabis. Cannabis was removed from the U.S. Pharmacopeia in 1941, and officially banned for any use with the passage of the Controlled Substances Act of 1970.

Cannabis began to attract renewed interest as medicine in the 1970s and 1980s, in particular due to its use by cancer and AIDS patients who reported relief from the effects of chemotherapy and wasting syndrome. In 1996, California became the first U.S. state to legalize medical cannabis in defiance of federal law. In 2001, Canada became the first country to adopt a system regulating the medical use of cannabis.

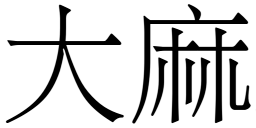
The use of cannabis, at least as fiber, has been shown to go back at least 10,000 years in Taiwan. "Dà má" (Pinyin pronunciation) is the Chinese expression for cannabis, the first character meaning "big" and the second character meaning "hemp".

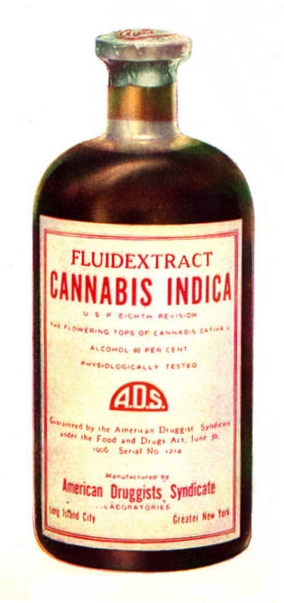
Cannabis indica fluid extract, American Druggists Syndicate, pre-1937

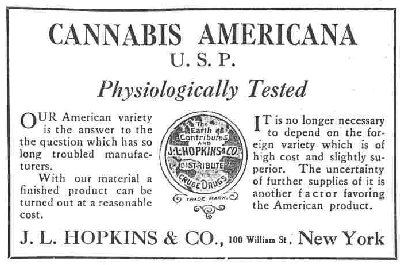
An advertisement for cannabis americana distributed by a pharmacist in New York in 1917

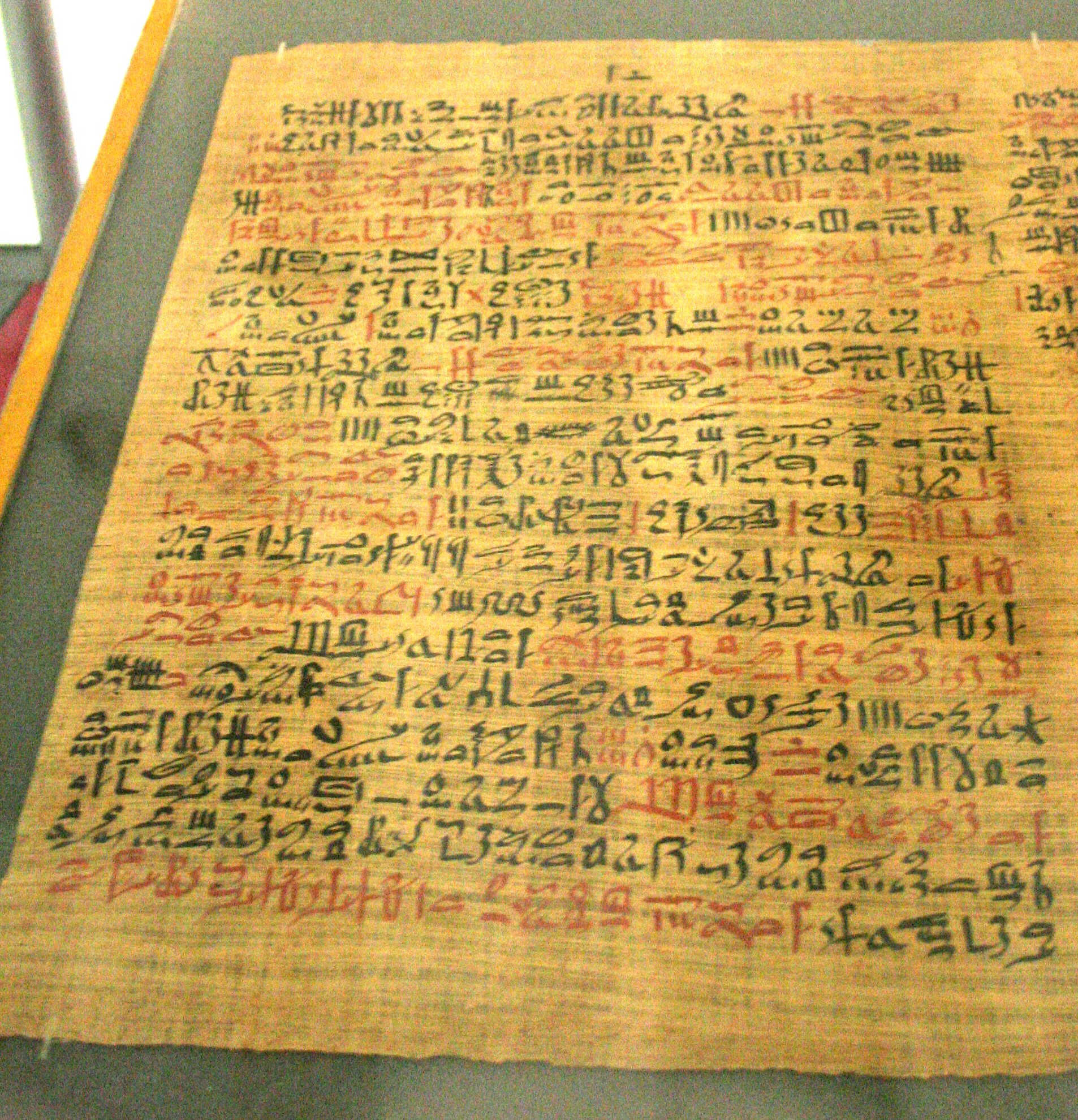
The Ebers Papyrus (c. 1550 BCE) from Ancient Egypt has a prescription for medical marijuana applied directly for inflammation.

== Society and culture ==
=== Legal status ===
Legal status of (whole-plant) medical cannabis worldwide (only de jure; may not reflect actual access in these countries) Legal as authorized by a physician Legal for any use (no prescription required) See also countries that have decriminalized or where enforcement is limited.

Countries that have legalized the medical use of cannabis include Argentina, Australia, Brazil, Canada, Chile, Colombia, Costa Rica, Croatia, Cyprus, Czech Republic, Finland, Germany, Greece, Israel, Italy, Jamaica, Lebanon, Luxembourg, Malta, Morocco, the Netherlands, New Zealand, North Macedonia, Panama, Peru, Poland, Portugal, Rwanda, Sri Lanka, Switzerland, Thailand, the United Kingdom, and Uruguay. Other countries have more restrictive laws that allow only the use of isolated cannabinoid drugs such as Sativex or Epidiolex. Countries with the most relaxed policies include Canada, the Netherlands, Thailand, and Uruguay, where cannabis can be purchased without need for a prescription. In Mexico, THC content of medical cannabis is limited to one percent. In the United States, the legality of medical cannabis varies by state.

However, in many of these countries, access may not always be possible under the same conditions.

==== International law ====
Cannabis and its derivatives are subject to regulation under three United Nations drug control treaties: the 1961 Single Convention on Narcotic Drugs, the 1971 Convention on Psychotropic Substances, and the 1988 Convention Against Illicit Traffic in Narcotic Drugs and Psychotropic Substances.

Cannabis and cannabis resin are classified as a Schedule I drug under the Single Convention treaty, meaning that medical use is considered "indispensable for the relief of pain and suffering" but that it is considered to be an addictive medication with risks of abuse. Countries have an obligation to provide access and sufficient availability of drugs listed in Schedule I for the purposes of medical uses.

Prior to December 2020 cannabis and cannabis resin were also included in Schedule IV, a more restrictive level of control, which is for only the most dangerous drugs such as heroin and fentanyl. They were removed after an independent scientific assessment by the World Health Organization in 2018–2019.

Member nations of the UN Commission on Narcotic Drugs voted 27–25 to remove it from Schedule IV on 2 December 2020, following a World Health Organization recommendation for removal in January 2019.

==== United States ====
In the United States, the use of cannabis for medical purposes is legal in 38 states, four out of five permanently inhabited U.S. territories, and the District of Columbia. An additional 10 states have more restrictive laws allowing the use of low-THC products. Cannabis remains illegal at the federal level under the Controlled Substances Act, which classifies it as a Schedule I drug with a high potential for abuse and no accepted medical use. In December 2014, however, the Rohrabacher–Farr amendment was signed into law, prohibiting the Justice Department from prosecuting individuals acting in accordance with state medical cannabis laws.

In the US, the FDA has approved two oral cannabinoids for use as medicine in 1985: dronabinol (pure delta-9-THC; brand name Marinol) and nabilone (a synthetic neocannabinoid; brand name Cesamet). In the US, they are both listed as Schedule II, indicating high potential for side effects and addiction.

=== Economics ===
==== Distribution ====
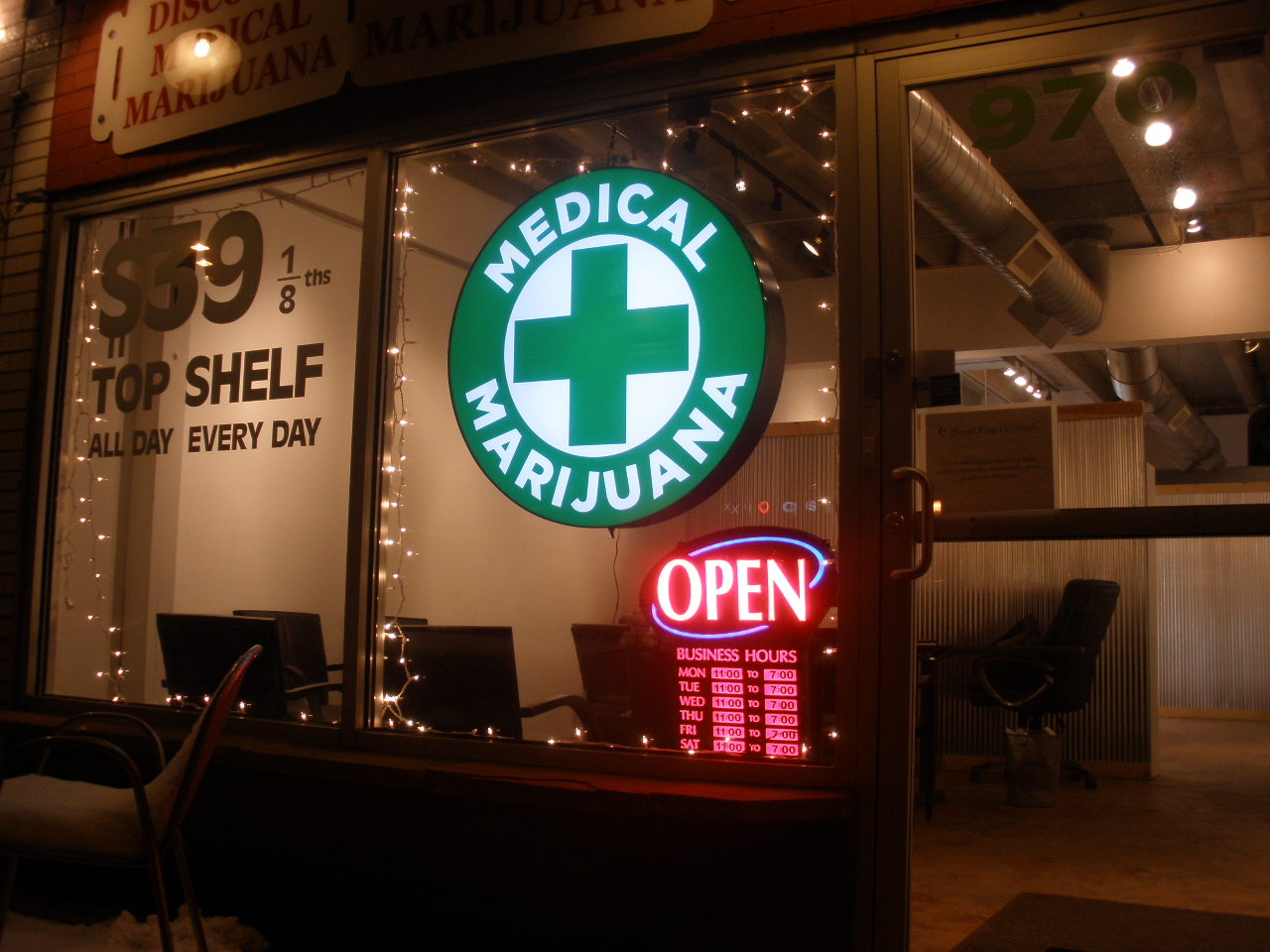
Medical marijuana dispensary in Denver, Colorado

The method of obtaining medical cannabis varies by region and by legislation. In the US, most consumers grow their own or buy it from cannabis dispensaries in states where it is legal. Marijuana vending machines for selling or dispensing cannabis are in use in the United States and are planned to be used in Canada. In 2014, the startup Meadow began offering on-demand delivery of medical marijuana in the San Francisco Bay Area, through their mobile app.

Almost 70% of medical cannabis is exported from the United Kingdom, according to a 2017 United Nations report, with much of the remaining amount coming from Canada and the Netherlands.

==== Insurance ====
In the United States, health insurance companies may not pay for a medical marijuana prescription as the Food and Drug Administration must approve any substance for medicinal purposes. Before this can happen, the FDA must first permit the study of the medical benefits and drawbacks of the substance, which it has not done since it was placed on Schedule I of the Controlled Substances Act in 1970. Therefore, all expenses incurred fulfilling a medical marijuana prescription will possibly be incurred as out-of-pocket. However, the New Mexico Court of Appeals has ruled that workers' compensation insurance must pay for prescribed marijuana as part of the state's Medical Cannabis Program.

=== Positions of medical organizations ===
Medical organizations that have issued statements in support of allowing access to medical cannabis include the American Nurses Association, American Public Health Association, American Medical Student Association, National Multiple Sclerosis Society, Epilepsy Foundation, and Leukemia & Lymphoma Society.

Organizations that oppose the legalization of medical cannabis include the American Academy of Pediatrics (AAP) and American Psychiatric Association. However, the AAP also supports rescheduling for the purpose of facilitating research.

The American Medical Association and American College of Physicians do not take a position on the legalization of medical cannabis, but have called for the Schedule I classification to be reviewed. The American Academy of Family Physicians and American Society of Addiction Medicine also do not take a position, but do support rescheduling to better facilitate research. The American Heart Association says that "many of the concerning health implications of cannabis include cardiovascular diseases" but that it supports rescheduling to allow "more nuanced ... marijuana legislation and regulation" and to "reflect the existing science behind cannabis". The American Cancer Society and American Psychological Association have noted the obstacles that exist for conducting research on cannabis, and have called on the federal government to better enable scientific study of the drug.

Cancer Research UK say that while cannabis is being studied for therapeutic potential, "claims that there is solid "proof" that cannabis or cannabinoids can cure cancer is highly misleading to patients and their families, and builds a false picture of the state of progress in this area".

=== Nonproprietary names ===
There are three International Nonproprietary Name (INN) granted for cannabinoids: two plant-derived phytocannabinoids and one neocannabinoid:

- Dronabinol is the INN for delta-9-THC (there is a common confusion according to which the word "dronabinol" would only refer to synthetic delta-9-THC, which is incorrect).
- Cannabidiol is also the official INN for the molecule, granted in 2017.
- Nabilone is the INN for a synthetic cannabinoid analog (not present in Cannabis plants).

Nabiximols is the generic name (but not recognized as an INN) of a mixture of Cannabidiol and Dronabinol. Its most common form is the oromucosal spray derived from two strains of Cannabis sativa and containing THC and CBD traded under the brand name Sativex®. It is not approved in the United States, but is approved in several European countries, Canada, and New Zealand as of 2013.

Generic name	Brand name(s)	Country (non-exhaustive)	Licensed indications
Nabilone	Cesamet	U.S., Canada	Antiemetic (treatment of nausea or vomiting) associated with chemotherapy that has failed to respond adequately to conventional therapy
Dronabinol	Marinol	U.S., Canada	Antiemetic (treatment of nausea or vomiting) associated with chemotherapy that has failed to respond adequately to conventional therapy
Dronabinol	Syndros	U.S.	Anorexia associated with AIDS–related weight loss
Nabiximols	Sativex	Canada, New Zealand, majority of the EU	Limited treatment for spasticity and neuropathic pain associated with multiple sclerosis and intractable cancer pain.

As an antiemetic, these medications are usually used when conventional treatment for nausea and vomiting associated with cancer chemotherapy fail to work.

Nabiximols is used for treatment of spasticity associated with MS when other therapies have not worked, and when an initial trial demonstrates "meaningful improvement". Trials for FDA approval in the US are underway. It is also approved in several European countries for overactive bladder and vomiting. When sold under the trade name Sativex as a mouth spray, the prescribed daily dose in Sweden delivers a maximum of 32.4 mg of THC and 30 mg of CBD; mild to moderate dizziness is common during the first few weeks.

Relative to inhaled consumption, peak concentration of oral THC is delayed, and it may be difficult to determine optimal dosage because of variability in patient absorption.

In 1964, Albert Lockhart and Manley West began studying the health effects of traditional cannabis use in Jamaican communities. They developed, and in 1987 gained permission to market, the pharmaceutical "Canasol", one of the first cannabis extracts.

== See also ==
- Charlotte's Web (cannabis)
- Chinese herbology
- Tilden's Extract
- Zenivol (ZTL-101)
- Medicinal uses of fungi
