= L-733,060 =

Chemical compound

Clinical data
- ATC code: None

Identifiers
- IUPAC name: (2S,3S)-3-{[3,5-bis(Trifluoromethyl)benzyl]oxy}-2-phenylpiperidine
- CAS Number: 148700-85-0
- PubChem CID: 132846
- ChemSpider: 117244
- UNII: PK8CG2B44U
- ChEMBL: ChEMBL27006
- CompTox Dashboard (EPA): DTXSID80933463

Chemical and physical data
- Formula: C_{20}H_{19}F_{6}NO
- Molar mass: 403.368 g·mol^{−1}
- 3D model (JSmol): Interactive image
- SMILES: c1ccc(cc1)[C@H]2[C@H](CCCN2)OCc3cc(cc(c3)C(F)(F)F)C(F)(F)F
- InChI: InChI=1S/C20H19F6NO/c21-19(22,23)15-9-13(10-16(11-15)20(24,25)26)12-28-17-7-4-8-27-18(17)14-5-2-1-3-6-14/h1-3,5-6,9-11,17-18,27H,4,7-8,12H2/t17-,18-/m0/s1; Key:FCDRFVCGMLUYPG-ROUUACIJSA-N

L-733,060 is a drug developed by Merck which acts as an orally active, non-peptide, selective antagonist for the NK_{1} receptor, binding with a K_{i} of 0.08 nM. Only one enantiomer is active which has made it the subject of several asymmetric synthesis efforts.

L-733,060 has antidepressant and anxiolytic effects in animal studies, and reduces both the dopamine release and neurotoxicity produced by methamphetamine and cocaine. It shows anti-inflammatory and anti-hepatotoxic effects in animals, and counteracts the development of hyperalgesia following nerve injury. It also has anticancer effects in a variety of in vitro models.

== See also ==
- NK_{1} receptor antagonists
- Aprepitant
- Casopitant
- Fosaprepitant
- Maropitant
- Vestipitant
- Vofopitant
