= Vestipitant =

Chemical compound

Clinical data
- ATC code: None

Identifiers
- IUPAC name: (2S)-N-{(1R)-1-[3,5-bis(trifluoromethyl) phenyl]ethyl}-2-(4-fluoro-2-methylphenyl)-N-methylpiperazine-1-carboxamide
- CAS Number: 334476-46-9; Mesylate: 334476-64-1
- PubChem CID: 9832383
- IUPHAR/BPS: 5757
- ChemSpider: 8008111
- UNII: S052TOI9BI; Mesylate: OWR424W90Q
- KEGG: D06293
- ChEMBL: ChEMBL522987
- CompTox Dashboard (EPA): DTXSID50187092

Chemical and physical data
- Formula: C_{23}H_{21}F_{10}N_{3}O
- Molar mass: 545.425 g·mol^{−1}
- 3D model (JSmol): Interactive image
- SMILES: FC(F)(F)c1cc(F)ccc1C2CNCCN2C(=O)N(C)C(C)c3cc(C(F)(F)F)cc(c3)C(F)(F)F
- InChI: InChI=1S/C23H24F7N3O/c1-13-8-18(24)4-5-19(13)20-12-31-6-7-33(20)21(34)32(3)14(2)15-9-16(22(25,26)27)11-17(10-15)23(28,29)30/h4-5,8-11,14,20,31H,6-7,12H2,1-3H3/t14-,20-/m1/s1; Key:SBBYBXSFWOLDDG-JLTOFOAXSA-N

Vestipitant (INN) is a drug developed by GlaxoSmithKline which acts as a selective antagonist for the NK_{1} receptor. It is under development as a potential antiemetic and anxiolytic drug, and as a treatment for tinnitus and insomnia.

== See also ==
- NK_{1} receptor antagonist
- Aprepitant
- Casopitant
- Fosaprepitant
- L-733,060
- Maropitant
