= Tachykinin receptor 1 =

Protein-coding gene in the species Homo sapiens

TACR1
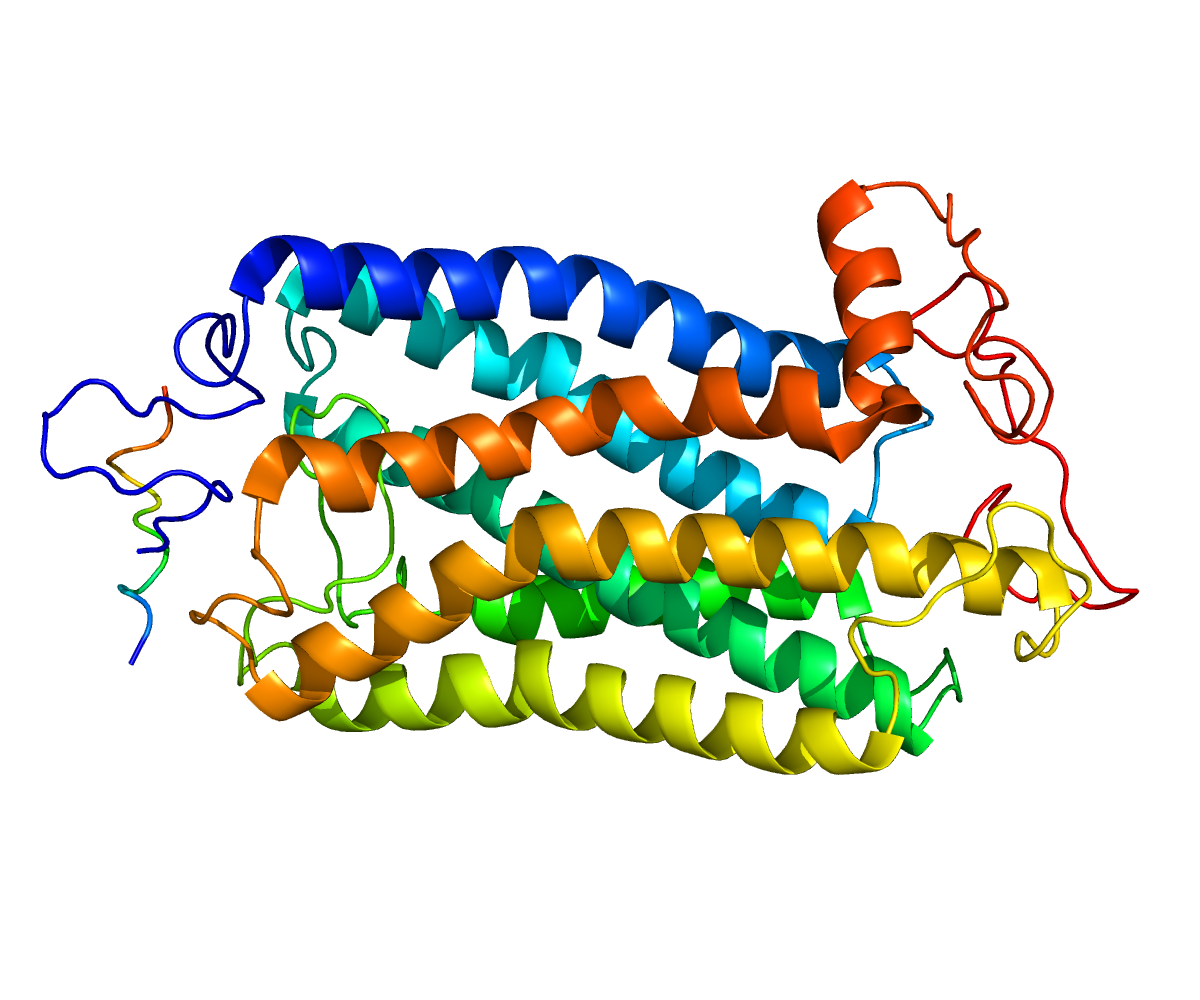

Identifiers
- Aliases: TACR1, NK1R, NKIR, SPR, TAC1R, tachykinin receptor 1
- External IDs: OMIM: 162323; MGI: 98475; GeneCards: TACR1
Available structures
PDB	Ortholog search: PDBe RCSB
PDB	List of PDB id codes 2KSB, 2KS9, 2KSA

Gene location (Human)
Chr.	Chromosome 2 (human)
Band	2p12	Start	75,046,463 bp
Band	2p12	End	75,199,520 bp

Gene location (Mouse)
Chr.	Chromosome 6 (mouse)
Band	6|6 C3	Start	82,379,315 bp
Band	6|6 C3	End	82,537,085 bp
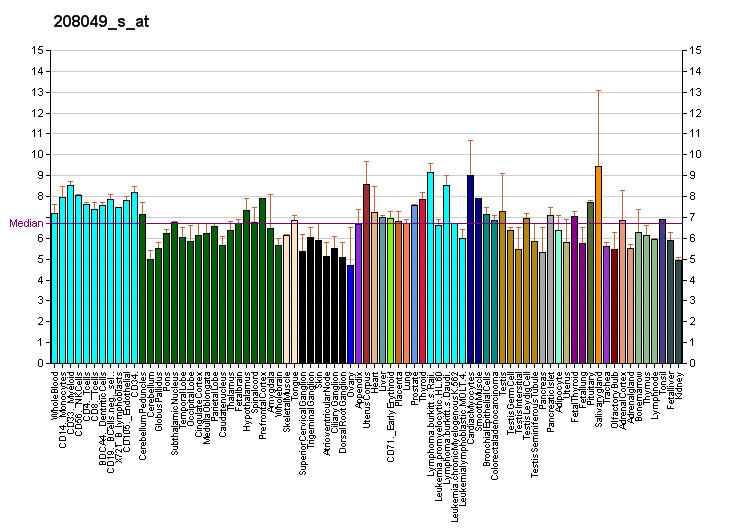

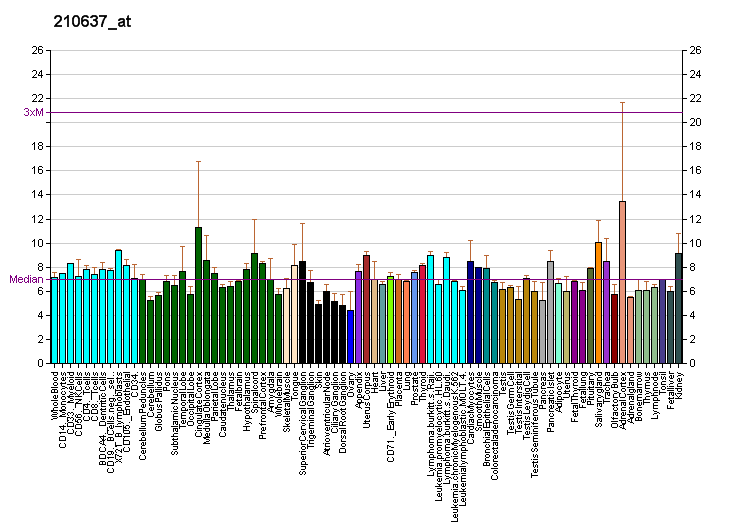
RNA expression pattern
Bgee	Human / Mouse (ortholog); Top expressed in: testicle; canal of the cervix; subcutaneous adipose tissue; ectocervix; body of uterus; left uterine tube; tendon of biceps brachii; Achilles tendon; smooth muscle tissue; vagina / Top expressed in: main bronchus; lens; superior frontal gyrus; trachea; thyroid gland; neural layer of retina; ventricular zone; stomach; neural tube; primary visual cortex; More reference expression data
BioGPS	More reference expression data
Gene ontology
Molecular function	tachykinin receptor activity; G protein-coupled receptor activity; signal transducer activity; protein binding; substance P receptor activity
Cellular component	integral component of membrane; membrane; plasma membrane; integral component of plasma membrane; cell periphery; cytoplasm; cell surface; dendrite; cell body; sperm flagellum; sperm head; sperm midpiece
Biological process	regulation of uterine smooth muscle contraction; phospholipase C-activating G protein-coupled receptor signaling pathway; response to pain; detection of abiotic stimulus; inflammatory response; positive regulation of smooth muscle contraction; signal transduction; chemical synaptic transmission; aggressive behavior; acute inflammatory response; positive regulation of leukocyte migration; angiotensin-mediated drinking behavior; learning or memory; long-term memory; regulation of blood pressure; associative learning; response to heat; response to hormone; response to ozone; positive regulation of epithelial cell migration; response to auditory stimulus; response to organic cyclic compound; regulation of smooth muscle cell migration; sensory perception of pain; positive regulation of synaptic transmission, cholinergic; positive regulation of synaptic transmission, GABAergic; response to estradiol; response to progesterone; response to nicotine; operant conditioning; positive regulation of renal sodium excretion; ejaculation; eating behavior; positive regulation of vascular permeability; response to morphine; response to ethanol; positive regulation of action potential; positive regulation of blood pressure; positive regulation of ossification; positive regulation of vasoconstriction; positive regulation of saliva secretion; positive regulation of hormone secretion; behavioral response to pain; regulation of smooth muscle cell proliferation; positive regulation of lymphocyte proliferation; positive regulation of epithelial cell proliferation; positive regulation of stress fiber assembly; response to electrical stimulus; smooth muscle contraction involved in micturition; positive regulation of uterine smooth muscle contraction; positive regulation of cytosolic calcium ion concentration; tachykinin receptor signaling pathway; positive regulation of flagellated sperm motility; G protein-coupled receptor signaling pathway
Sources:Amigo / QuickGO
Orthologs
Databases	NCBI: entry; OMA: entry
Species	Human	Mouse
Entrez	6869	21336
Ensembl	ENSG00000115353	ENSMUSG00000030043
UniProt	P25103	P30548
RefSeq (mRNA)	NM_015727; NM_001058	NM_009313
RefSeq (protein)	NP_001049; NP_056542	NP_033339
Location (UCSC)	Chr 2: 75.05 – 75.2 Mb	Chr 6: 82.38 – 82.54 Mb
PubMed search
- Wikidata
View/Edit Human	View/Edit Mouse

The tachykinin receptor 1 (TACR1) also known as neurokinin 1 receptor (NK1R) or substance P receptor (SPR) is a G protein coupled receptor found in the central nervous system and peripheral nervous system. The endogenous ligand for this receptor is Substance P, although it has some affinity for other tachykinins. The protein is the product of the TACR1 gene.

== Structure ==
Tachykinins are a family of neuropeptides that share the same hydrophobic C-terminal region with the amino acid sequence Phe-X-Gly-Leu-Met-NH_{2}, where X represents a hydrophobic residue that is either an aromatic or a beta-branched aliphatic. The N-terminal region varies between different tachykinins. The term tachykinin originates in the rapid onset of action caused by the peptides in smooth muscles.

Substance P (SP) is the most researched and potent member of the tachykinin family. It is an undecapeptide with the amino acid sequence Arg-Pro-Lys-Pro-Gln-Gln-Phe-Phe-Gly-Leu-Met-NH_{2}. SP binds to all three of the tachykinin receptors, but it binds most strongly to the NK_{1} receptor.

The tachykinin NK_{1} receptor consists of 407 amino acid residues, and it has a molecular weight of 58,000. NK_{1} receptor, as well as the other tachykinin receptors, is made of seven hydrophobic transmembrane (TM) domains with three extracellular and three intracellular loops, an amino-terminus and a cytoplasmic carboxy-terminus. The loops have functional sites, including two cysteines for a disulfide bridge, Asp-Arg-Tyr, responsible for association with arrestin, and Lys/Arg-Lys/Arg-X-X-Lys/Arg, which interacts with G-proteins. The binding site for substance P and other agonists and antagonists is found between the second and third transmembrane domains. The NK-1 receptor is found on human chromosome 2 and is located on the cell's surface as a cytoplasmic receptor.

== Function ==
The binding of SP to the NK_{1} receptor has been associated with the transmission of stress signals and pain, the contraction of smooth muscles, and inflammation. NK_{1} receptor antagonists have also been studied in migraine, emesis, and psychiatric disorders. In fact, aprepitant has been proved effective in a number of pathophysiological models of anxiety and depression. Other diseases in which the NK_{1} receptor system is involved include asthma, rheumatoid arthritis, and gastrointestinal disorders.

== Tissue distribution ==
The NK_{1} receptor can be found in both the central and peripheral nervous system. It is present in neurons, brainstem, vascular endothelial cells, muscle, gastrointestinal tracts, genitourinary tract, pulmonary tissue, thyroid gland, and different types of immune cells.

== Mechanisms of action ==
SP is synthesized by neurons and transported to synaptic vesicles; the release of SP is accomplished through the depolarizing action of calcium-dependent mechanisms. When NK_{1} receptors are stimulated, they can generate various second messengers, which can trigger a wide range of effector mechanisms that regulate cellular excitability and function.

There are three well-defined, independent second messenger systems:

1. Stimulation via phospholipase C, leading to phosphatidyl inositol turnover and Ca mobilization from both intra- and extracellular sources.
2. Arachidonic acid mobilization via phospholipase A2.
3. cAMP accumulation via stimulation of adenylate cyclase.

It has also been reported that SP elicits interleukin-1 (IL-1) production in macrophages, sensitizes neutrophils, and enhances dopamine release in the substantia nigra region in cat brain. From spinal neurons, SP is known to evoke release of neurotransmitters like acetylcholine, histamine, and GABA. It also secretes catecholamines and plays a role in the regulation of blood pressure and hypertension. Likewise, SP is known to bind to N-methyl-D-aspartate (NMDA) receptors, eliciting excitation with calcium ion influx, which further releases nitric oxide. Studies in frogs have shown that SP elicits the release of prostaglandin E_{2} and prostacyclin by the arachidonic acid pathway, which leads to an increase in corticosteroid output.

== Clinical significance ==
In combination therapy, NK_{1} receptor antagonists appear to offer better control of delayed emesis and post-operative emesis than drug therapy without NK_{1} receptor antagonists. NK_{1} receptor antagonists block responses to a broader range of emetic stimuli than the established 5-HT_{3} antagonist treatments. It has been reported that centrally-acting NK_{1} receptor antagonists, such as CP-99994, inhibit emesis induced by apomorphine and loperimidine, which are two compounds that act through central mechanisms.

This receptor is considered an attractive drug target, particularly with regards to potential analgesics and anti-depressants. It is also a potential treatment for alcoholism and opioid addiction. In addition, it has been identified as a candidate in the etiology of bipolar disorder. Finally NK1R antagonists may also have a role as novel antiemetics and hypnotics.

Neurokinin receptor 1 (NK-1R) also plays a significant role in cancer progression. NK-1R is overexpressed in various cancer types and is activated by substance P (SP). This activation promotes tumor cell proliferation, migration, and invasion while inhibiting apoptosis. The SP/NK-1R system is involved in angiogenesis, chronic inflammation, and the Warburg effect, all of which contribute to tumor growth. NK-1R antagonists, such as aprepitant, have shown promise as potential anticancer treatments by inhibiting tumor growth, inducing apoptosis, and blocking metastasis. The overexpression of NK-1R in tumors may also serve as a prognostic biomarker.

== Ligands ==
Many selective ligands for NK_{1} are now available, several of which have gone into clinical use as antiemetics.

=== Agonists ===
- GR-73632 - potent and selective agonist, EC_{50} 2nM, 5-amino acid polypeptide chain. CAS# 133156-06-6

=== Antagonists ===
- Aprepitant
- Casopitant
- Elinzanetant
- Ezlopitant
- Fosaprepitant
- Lanepitant
- Maropitant
- Rolapitant
- Tradipitant
- Vestipitant
- Befetupitant
- Netupitant
- Fosnetupitant
- Orvepitant
- L-733,060
- L-741,671
- L-742,694
- RP-67580 - potent and selective antagonist, Ki 2.9nM, (3aR,7aR)-Octahydro-2-[1-imino-2-(2-methoxyphenyl)ethyl ]-7,7-diphenyl-4H-isoindol, CAS# 135911-02-3
- RPR-100,893
- CP-96345
- CP-99994
- GR-205,171/Vofopitant
- TAK-637
- T-2328

== See also ==
- NK1 receptor antagonist
- Tachykinin receptor
- Discovery and development of neurokinin 1 receptor antagonists
