= Ezlopitant =

Chemical compound

Clinical data
- Other names: CJ-11,974; (2S,3S)-2-Diphenylmethyl-3-[(5-isopropyl-2-methoxybenzyl)amino]quinuclidine
- Routes of administration: By mouth
- ATC code: none

Legal status
- Legal status: In general: uncontrolled

Pharmacokinetic data
- Excretion: Urine (32%), Feces (51%)

Identifiers
- IUPAC name: (2S,3S)-2-Benzhydryl-N-[(5-isopropyl-2-methoxy-phenyl)methyl]quinuclidin-3-amine
- CAS Number: 147116-64-1
- PubChem CID: 188927
- IUPHAR/BPS: 5751
- ChemSpider: 164166
- UNII: 3L098A8MPY
- ChEMBL: ChEMBL515966
- CompTox Dashboard (EPA): DTXSID601318557

Chemical and physical data
- Formula: C_{31}H_{38}N_{2}O
- Molar mass: 454.658 g·mol^{−1}
- 3D model (JSmol): Interactive image
- SMILES: COc1ccc(cc1CN[C@H]2C3CCN(CC3)[C@H]2C(c4ccccc4)c5ccccc5)C(C)C
- InChI: InChI=1S/C31H38N2O/c1-22(2)26-14-15-28(34-3)27(20-26)21-32-30-25-16-18-33(19-17-25)31(30)29(23-10-6-4-7-11-23)24-12-8-5-9-13-24/h4-15,20,22,25,29-32H,16-19,21H2,1-3H3/t30-,31-/m0/s1; Key:XPNMCDYOYIKVGB-CONSDPRKSA-N

Ezlopitant (INN, code name CJ-11,974) is an NK_{1} receptor antagonist. It has antiemetic and antinociceptive effects. Pfizer was developing ezlopitant for the treatment of irritable bowel syndrome but it appears to have been discontinued.

== See also ==
- NK_{1} receptor antagonist
- Maropitant (tert-butyl instead of isopropyl)
