= Netupitant/palonosetron =

Pharmaceutical drug

Combination of
- Netupitant: NK_{1} receptor antagonist
- Palonosetron: 5-HT_{3} receptor antagonist

Clinical data
- Trade names: Akynzeo
- AHFS/Drugs.com: Monograph
- MedlinePlus: a614053
- License data: US DailyMed: Netupitant
- Pregnancy category: AU: B3
- Routes of administration: By mouth, intravenous
- ATC code: A04AA55 (WHO)

Legal status
- Legal status: AU: S4 (Prescription only); CA: ℞-only; UK: POM (Prescription only); US: ℞-only; EU: Rx-only; In general: ℞ (Prescription only)

Identifiers
- CAS Number: 2446322-17-2
- KEGG: D10572

Netupitant/palonosetron, sold under the brand name Akynzeo, is a fixed-dose combination medication used for the prevention of acute and delayed chemotherapy-induced nausea and vomiting. It is marketed and distributed by Helsinn Therapeutics. Netupitant is an NK_{1} receptor antagonist and palonosetron is a 5-HT_{3} receptor antagonist.

The capsules contain netupitant and palonosetron hydrochloride. The intravenous version is a combination of fosnetupitant chloride hydrochloride and palonosetron hydrochloride.

== Contraindications ==
Netupitant/palonosetron may be contraindicated during pregnancy.

== Adverse effects ==
The most common side effects include headache, weakness, fatigue, upset stomach, constipation, and skin redness. The overall profile of adverse effects is comparable to that of palonosetron (see Palonosetron#Adverse effects); no common adverse effects can be attributed to netupitant.

== History ==
Netupitant/palonosetron was approved for use in the United States in October 2014. It was approved for use in the European Union in May 2015. The intravenous version, which contains the prodrug fosnetupitant in place of netupitant, was approved in the United States in April 2018.
