= Befetupitant =

Chemical compound

Clinical data
- ATC code: none

Identifiers
- IUPAC name: 2-[3,5-bis(trifluoromethyl)phenyl]-N,2-dimethyl-N-[4-(2-methylphenyl)-6-morpholin-4-ylpyridin-3-yl]propanamide
- CAS Number: 290296-68-3
- PubChem CID: 6450815
- ChemSpider: 4953365
- UNII: RSH7NDI7MI
- CompTox Dashboard (EPA): DTXSID90183270

Chemical and physical data
- Formula: C_{29}H_{29}F_{6}N_{3}O_{2}
- Molar mass: 565.560 g·mol^{−1}
- 3D model (JSmol): Interactive image
- SMILES: CC1=CC=CC=C1C2=CC(=NC=C2N(C)C(=O)C(C)(C)C3=CC(=CC(=C3)C(F)(F)F)C(F)(F)F)N4CCOCC4
- InChI: InChI=1S/C29H29F6N3O2/c1-18-7-5-6-8-22(18)23-16-25(38-9-11-40-12-10-38)36-17-24(23)37(4)26(39)27(2,3)19-13-20(28(30,31)32)15-21(14-19)29(33,34)35/h5-8,13-17H,9-12H2,1-4H3; Key:ZGNPLCMMVKCTHM-UHFFFAOYSA-N

Befetupitant (Ro67-5930) is a drug developed by Hoffmann-La Roche which acts as a potent and selective antagonist for the NK_{1} receptor. It was originally developed as a potential antiemetic drug, though development was ultimately discontinued after a related drug netupitant was deemed to be more suitable for clinical development. Befetupitant has however continued to be researched for other possible applications such as treatment of corneal neovascularization.
