= Tradipitant =

Chemical compound

Clinical data
- Trade names: Nereus
- Other names: VLY-686, LY686017
- AHFS/Drugs.com: nereus
- License data: US DailyMed: Tradipitant
- Routes of administration: By mouth
- Drug class: Neurokinin NK1 antagonist
- ATC code: None

Legal status
- Legal status: US: ℞-only

Identifiers
- IUPAC name: (2-(1-(3,5-Bis(trifluoromethyl)benzyl)-5-(pyridin-4-yl)-1H-1,2,3-triazol-4-yl)pyridin-3-yl)(2-chlorophenyl)methanone
- CAS Number: 622370-35-8
- PubChem CID: 9916461
- DrugBank: DB12580
- ChemSpider: 8092108
- UNII: NY0COC51FI
- KEGG: D11728
- ChEMBL: ChEMBL3544984
- CompTox Dashboard (EPA): DTXSID801045805

Chemical and physical data
- Formula: C_{28}H_{16}ClF_{6}N_{5}O
- Molar mass: 587.91 g·mol^{−1}
- 3D model (JSmol): Interactive image
- SMILES: Clc1ccccc1C(=O)c2c(nccc2)c3nnn(c3c4ccncc4)Cc5cc(cc(c5)C(F)(F)F)C(F)(F)F
- InChI: InChI=1S/C28H16ClF6N5O/c29-22-6-2-1-4-20(22)26(41)21-5-3-9-37-23(21)24-25(17-7-10-36-11-8-17)40(39-38-24)15-16-12-18(27(30,31)32)14-19(13-16)28(33,34)35/h1-14H,15H2; Key:CAVRKWRKTNINFF-UHFFFAOYSA-N

Tradipitant, sold under the brand name Nereus, is a medication used as prevention of vomiting induced by motion (motion sickness). It is a neurokinin 1 receptor antagonist. It works by blocking substance P, a small signaling molecule. VLY-686 was purchased by Vanda Pharmaceuticals from Eli Lilly and Company in 2012.

Tradipitant was approved for medical use in the United States in December 2025.

== Medical uses ==
Tradipitant is indicated for the prevention of vomiting induced by motion.

== Society and culture ==
=== Legal status ===
Tradipitant was approved for medical use in the United States in December 2025.

=== Names ===
Tradipitant is the international nonproprietary name.

Tradipitant is sold under the brand name Nereus.
