= TAC4 =

Protein-coding gene in the species Homo sapiens

Identifiers
- Aliases: TAC4, EK, HK-1, HK1, PPT-C, tachykinin 4 (hemokinin), tachykinin 4, tachykinin precursor 4
- External IDs: OMIM: 607833; MGI: 1931130; GeneCards: TAC4
Available structures
PDB	Ortholog search: PDBe RCSB
PDB	List of PDB id codes 2MOC

Gene location (Human)
Chr.	Chromosome 17 (human)
Band	17q21.33	Start	49,838,300 bp
Band	17q21.33	End	49,848,069 bp

Gene location (Mouse)
Chr.	Chromosome 11 (mouse)
Band	11|11 D	Start	95,152,355 bp
Band	11|11 D	End	95,160,091 bp
RNA expression pattern
Bgee	Human / Mouse (ortholog); Top expressed in: tendon of biceps brachii; buccal mucosa cell; myocardium; granulocyte; vena cava; cerebellar vermis; anterior pituitary; right lobe of thyroid gland; blood; left lobe of thyroid gland / Top expressed in: lip; pineal gland; olfactory epithelium; tibiofemoral joint; right ventricle; skin of abdomen; lumbar spinal ganglion; aortic valve; granulocyte; medial ganglionic eminence; More reference expression data
BioGPS	n/a
Gene ontology
Molecular function	signaling receptor binding; substance P receptor binding; substance K receptor binding; receptor ligand activity
Cellular component	extracellular region; extracellular space
Biological process	regulation of blood pressure; inflammatory response; cell-cell signaling; negative regulation of systemic arterial blood pressure; tachykinin receptor signaling pathway; regulation of signaling receptor activity; detection of temperature stimulus involved in sensory perception of pain; regulation of sensory perception of pain; positive regulation of flagellated sperm motility; negative regulation of sensory perception of pain; positive regulation of sensory perception of pain; positive regulation of cytosolic calcium ion concentration
Sources:Amigo / QuickGO
Orthologs
Databases	NCBI: entry; OMA: entry
Species	Human	Mouse
Entrez	255061	93670
Ensembl	ENSG00000176358	ENSMUSG00000020872
UniProt	Q86UU9	Q99N14
RefSeq (mRNA)	NM_170685; NM_001077503; NM_001077504; NM_001077505; NM_001077506	NM_053093
RefSeq (protein)	NP_001070971; NP_001070972; NP_001070973; NP_001070974; NP_733786	NP_444323
Location (UCSC)	Chr 17: 49.84 – 49.85 Mb	Chr 11: 95.15 – 95.16 Mb
PubMed search
- Wikidata
View/Edit Human	View/Edit Mouse

Tachykinin-4 is a protein that in humans is encoded by the TAC4 gene.

This gene is a member of the tachykinin family of neurotransmitter-encoding genes. Tachykinin proteins are cleaved into small, secreted peptides that activate members of a family of receptor proteins. The products of this gene preferentially activate tachykinin receptor 1 and are thought to regulate peripheral endocrine and paracrine functions including blood pressure, the immune system, and endocrine gland secretion. The products of this gene lack a dibasic cleavage site found in other tachykinin proteins. Consequently, the nature of the cleavage products generated in vivo remains to be determined. Multiple transcript variants encoding different isoforms have been found for this gene.
