= Ronald de Wit =

Professor of medical oncology

Ronald de Wit is a Genito-Urinary medical oncologist, Professor emeritus, from 1990 to 2025 affiliated at the Department of medical oncology at Erasmus University Medical Center in Rotterdam, Netherlands. He is the founding chairman of the Dutch Uro-Oncology Study Group (DUOS).

== Early life and education ==
Ronald de Wit was born on August 8, 1955, in Amsterdam. He earned his MD from the University of Amsterdam and became a Registered Specialist in Internal Medicine. In 1990, he completed his training in Medical Oncology and earned his PhD on the topic "Treatment Aspects of AIDS-associated Kaposi’s Sarcoma" comprising research work published in the Lancet

== Research and career ==
Ronald de Wit has been the lead investigator or senior author on numerous trials related to germ cell cancer. One trial demonstrated that three cycles of BEP were an adequate treatment for good-risk metastatic disease.

He has been involved in several clinical research projects on prostate cancer. One study identified docetaxel as an effective treatment for castrate-resistant prostate cancer. He was the Lead author of the CARD trial reported in the New England Journal of Medicine in 2019. His research encompasses both clinical and translational studies, focusing on the interplay between taxanes and the latest hormonal agents, as well as biomarker investigations. He is also affiliated with the Research Unit for Translational Pharmacology in the Department of Medical Oncology at Erasmus University Medical Center.

During the 2010s, he participated in industry-led immunotherapy trials in urothelial carcinoma Wikipedia Transitional cell carcinoma. These trials paved the way for the approval of Pembrolizumab in both second and first-line treatments, including for non-muscle invasive disease. His contributions extend to translational and immuno-oncology research, specifically on biomarker studies that determine prognostic and predictive factors for checkpoint inhibition.

In addition to his contributions in the treatment of urological cancers, Ronald de Wit has been involved in advancing the management of chemotherapy-induced nausea and vomiting. He introduced a statistical method that revealed the diminishing efficacy of 5HT3 Receptor antagonists as antiemetic treatment over consecutive cycles of therapy, primarily due to their inability to manage delayed nausea effectively. He played a role in the development and subsequent FDA and EMA approval of the NK1 antagonist aprepitant NK1 receptor antagonist. His research highlighted that when 5HT3 and NK1 drugs are used in combination, they offer considerably enhanced efficacy throughout multiple cycles due to improved control over delayed nausea and emesis.

He is member of the Academy of Europe.

January 2025 he was awarded Knight in the order of the Netherlands Lion.

== Selected publications ==
- De Wit R, Sleijfer S, Kaye SB, Horwich A, Mead B, Sleijfer DT, Stoter G

Bleomycin and scuba diving: where is the harm?

- De Wit R.

Optimal management of germ cell cancer: more a matter of expertise than of chemotherapy regimen.

- van de Wetering RAW, Sleijfer S, Feldman DR, Funt SA, Bosl GJ, de Wit R.

Controversies in the Management of Clinical Stage I Seminoma: Carboplatin a Decade in-Time to Start Backing Out.

- van Soest RJ, Tombal B, Lolkema MP, de Wit R.

Cell-free DNA in Advanced Prostate Cancer: A Biomarker Revolution Under Way?

- de Wit R.

Refinement of the Management of Germ Cell Cancer: What's Next?

- Ronald de Wit, Bertrand Tombal, Stephen Freedland

Use of Chemotherapy and Androgen Signaling-targeted Inhibitors in Patients with Metastatic Prostate Cancer.

- Joaquim Bellmunt, Ronald de Wit, Yves Fradet, et al

Putative Biomarkers of Clinical Benefit With Pembrolizumab in Advanced Urothelial Cancer: Results from the KEYNOTE-045 and KEYNOTE-052 Landmark Trials.
