= Fosnetupitant =

Chemical compound

Clinical data
- Other names: 07-PNET, fosnetupitant chloride hydrochloride
- ATC code: None

Identifiers
- CAS Number: 1703748-89-3
- PubChem CID: 71544786
- DrugBank: DB14019
- ChemSpider: 44208829
- UNII: T672P80L2S
- KEGG: D11065
- ChEMBL: ChEMBL3989917
- CompTox Dashboard (EPA): DTXSID601027641

Chemical and physical data
- Formula: C_{31}H_{35}F_{6}N_{4}O_{5}P
- Molar mass: 688.608 g·mol^{−1}

Fosnetupitant is a medication used for the treatment of chemotherapy-induced nausea and vomiting. It is a prodrug of netupitant. It is used in combination with palonosetron hydrochloride and formulated as the salt fosnetupitant chloride hydrochloride for intravenous use.

In 2018, the US Food and Drug Administration approved the intravenous formulation of a fixed dose combination of fosnetupitant and palonosetron. The combination is also approved for medical use in the European Union, and in Canada.
