= Metopimazine =

Chemical compound

Clinical data
- Trade names: Vogalen, Vogalene
- Other names: EXP-999; RP-9965; NG-101
- AHFS/Drugs.com: International Drug Names
- Routes of administration: Oral
- ATC code: A04AD05 (WHO)

Legal status
- Legal status: In general: ℞ (Prescription only)

Identifiers
- IUPAC name: 1-(3-[2-(methylsulfonyl)-10H-phenothiazin-10-yl]propyl)piperidine-4-carboxamide
- CAS Number: 14008-44-7
- PubChem CID: 26388
- DrugBank: DB13591
- ChemSpider: 24584
- UNII: 238S75V9AV
- KEGG: D05010
- ChEBI: CHEBI:135726
- ChEMBL: ChEMBL398615
- CompTox Dashboard (EPA): DTXSID80161224
- ECHA InfoCard: 100.034.367

Chemical and physical data
- Formula: C_{22}H_{27}N_{3}O_{3}S_{2}
- Molar mass: 445.60 g·mol^{−1}
- 3D model (JSmol): Interactive image
- SMILES: O=S(=O)(c2cc1N(c3c(Sc1cc2)cccc3)CCCN4CCC(C(=O)N)CC4)C
- InChI: InChI=1S/C22H27N3O3S2/c1-30(27,28)17-7-8-21-19(15-17)25(18-5-2-3-6-20(18)29-21)12-4-11-24-13-9-16(10-14-24)22(23)26/h2-3,5-8,15-16H,4,9-14H2,1H3,(H2,23,26); Key:BQDBKDMTIJBJLA-UHFFFAOYSA-N

Metopimazine (INN, USAN, BAN), sold under the brand names Vogalen and Vogalene, is an antiemetic of the phenothiazine group which is used to treat nausea and vomiting. It is marketed in Europe, Canada, and South America. As of August 2020, metopimazine has been repurposed and is additionally under development for use in the United States for the treatment of gastroparesis.

Metopimazine has antidopaminergic, antihistamine, and anticholinergic activity. However, it has also been described as a highly potent and selective dopamine D_{2} and D_{3} receptor antagonist. The D_{2} receptor antagonism of metopimazine is thought to underlie its antiemetic and gastroprokinetic effects. It is said to not readily cross the blood–brain barrier and hence to have peripheral selectivity, in contrast to metoclopramide but similarly to domperidone. Unlike domperidone however, metopimazine shows no hERG inhibition and hence is expected to have a more favorable cardiovascular profile. In contrast to metoclopramide, metopimazine does not interact with serotonin 5-HT_{3} and 5-HT_{4} receptors.

== Medical uses ==
Metopimazine is an approved prescription drug in France under the brand name Vogalene® that has been used for the treatment of nausea and vomiting. Vogalene® is available under different forms, including 15 mg capsules, 7.5 mg orally disintegrating tablets, 5 mg suppository, 0.1% oral liquid, and a 10 mg/mL intravenous (IV) solution approved for the prevention of chemotherapy-induced nausea and vomiting. Metopimazine is also an over-the-counter medication available in pharmacies in France (Vogalib®, 7.5 mg orally disintegrating tablets). The approved dose is 30 mg per day. Most adult prescriptions are for seasonal gastroenteritis or acute nausea and vomiting of various etiologies. The IV formulation is almost exclusively used to treat chemotherapy-induced nausea and vomiting in adults and children.

== Adverse effects ==
Generally, studies in chemotherapy-induced nausea and vomiting suggest that doses of metopimazine higher than approved for common nausea and vomiting conditions tend to be more efficacious while remaining safe and well tolerated. Numerous open-label and randomized, placebo-controlled efficacy studies involving oral administration (ranging from 7.5 mg/day for 4 days, to up to 45 mg/day for ~7–30 days, to 120 mg/day for 4 days) or IV administration (10 mg to 40 mg) of metopimazine have concluded that metopimazine is safe and well tolerated with no report of severe adverse events. In a dose-ranging, open-label study in patients undergoing chemotherapy, metopimazine administered orally at 20, 30, 40, 50, or 60 mg every 4 hours (q4h) for 48 hours was used to determine its safety and tolerability. Metopimazine was determined to be safe at a dose of 30 mg administered 6 times daily (180 mg/day). The dose-limiting toxicity to metopimazine was moderate-to-severe dizziness caused by orthostatic hypotension, which was observed beginning at 40 mg every 4 hours for 48 hours. Other side effects were few and mild in severity. A single possibly drug-related extrapyramidal adverse event was observed in a patient in the 60 mg q4h or 360 mg daily dose group. In a randomized, double-blind comparison of ondansetron versus ondansetron plus metopimazine as an antiemetic prophylaxis during platinum-based chemotherapy, metopimazine was administered by IV (24-hour continuous infusion) at 35 mg/m^{2} followed by 30 mg per orally (PO) 4 times a day (120 mg/day) for 4 days. Metopimazine plus ondansetron was more efficacious than ondansetron alone, and adverse reactions were mild and without significant differences between the two treatment groups. However, there was an asymptomatic decrease in standing blood pressure when patients received the combination antiemetic therapy. In a randomized, double-blind study assessing the efficacy and safety of sublingual metopimazine compared to ondansetron in chemotherapy-induced delayed emesis, patients received either 45 mg/day of metopimazine (7.5 mg x 2 every 8 hours) or 16 mg/day of ondansetron (8 mg every 12 hours). Results showed that metopimazine was comparable in efficacy to ondansetron; however, the incidence of gastrointestinal disorders was significantly lower in the metopimazine group, particularly abdominal pain and constipation.

== Mechanism of action ==
Metopimazine, a phenothiazine derivative, is a potent D2/D3 dopamine receptor antagonist. Metopimazine has also shown adrenergic alpha1, histamine H1, serotonin 5HT2a antagonism.

== Pharmacokinetics ==
The pharmacokinetics (PK) profile of metopimazine has been reported as comparable between adults and children. The maximum plasma concentration (Cmax) of metopimazine is reached approximately 60 minutes after oral administration, and the elimination half-life is approximately two hours. Metopimazine is rapidly metabolized to metopimazine acid (Tmax ~2 hours), its major metabolite in humans. Metopimazine is primarily metabolized by a liver amidase in humans and therefore present a low risk on drug-drug interaction. Exposure is reduced by ~30% and 50% (area under the curve (AUC) and Cmax, respectively) when metopimazine is administered with food.

The bioavailability of metopimazine in humans is low. A 10 mg dose of metopimazine was reported to have an absolute bioavailability under 20%.

== Research ==
Metopimazine mesylate (NG101), a novel formulation of metopimazine, is under clinical development for idiopathic gastroparesis in the United States. Gastroparesis is a debilitating chronic gastrointestinal disorder characterized by delayed gastric emptying without evidence of mechanical obstruction. Symptoms include nausea, vomiting, early satiety, postprandial fullness, bloating, and upper abdominal pain.

== Synthesis ==
Thieme Patent: Revised:

For the first step, 2-Methylthiophenothiazine [7643-08-5] (1) is protected by sequential reaction with sodium amide and acetic anhydride to give 1-[2-(Methylthio)-10H-phenothiazin-10-yl]ethanone [23503-69-7] (2). Oxidation with peracid proceeds preferentially on the more electron-rich alkyl thioether to give the sulfone. Upon hydrolysis of the acetate this affords 2-(methylsulfonyl)-10h-phenothiazine [23503-68-6] (3). Alkylation with 1-Bromo-3-chloropropane (4) gives 10-(3-chloropropyl)-2-methylsulfonylphenothiazine [40051-30-7] (5). Alkylation with piperidine-4-carboxamide (Isonipecotamide) [39546-32-2] (6) affords metopimazine (7).
