= Netupitant =

Chemical compound

Clinical data
- License data: EU EMA: by INN
- Drug class: NK1 receptor antagonists, antiemetics
- ATC code: None

Pharmacokinetic data
- Bioavailability: >60% (estimated)
- Protein binding: >99%
- Metabolism: mainly CYP3A4; also CYP2D6 and CYP2C9
- Elimination half-life: 88 hours
- Excretion: 71% (faeces)

Identifiers
- IUPAC name: 2-[3,5-Bis(trifluoromethyl)phenyl]-N,2-dimethyl-N-[4-(2-methylphenyl)-6-(4-methyl-1-piperazinyl)-3-pyridinyl]propanamide
- CAS Number: 290297-26-6
- PubChem CID: 6451149
- DrugBank: DB09048
- ChemSpider: 4953629
- UNII: 7732P08TIR
- KEGG: D05152
- ChEBI: CHEBI:85155
- ChEMBL: ChEMBL206253
- CompTox Dashboard (EPA): DTXSID50183271

Chemical and physical data
- Formula: C_{30}H_{32}F_{6}N_{4}O
- Molar mass: 578.603 g·mol^{−1}
- 3D model (JSmol): Interactive image
- SMILES: Cc1ccccc1c2cc(ncc2N(C)C(=O)C(C)(C)c3cc(cc(c3)C(F)(F)F)C(F)(F)F)N4CCN(CC4)C
- InChI: InChI=1S/C30H32F6N4O/c1-19-8-6-7-9-23(19)24-17-26(40-12-10-38(4)11-13-40)37-18-25(24)39(5)27(41)28(2,3)20-14-21(29(31,32)33)16-22(15-20)30(34,35)36/h6-9,14-18H,10-13H2,1-5H3; Key:WAXQNWCZJDTGBU-UHFFFAOYSA-N

Netupitant is an antiemetic medication. In the United States, the combinations of netupitant/palonosetron and the prodrug fosnetupitant/palonosetron (both brand name Akynzeo) are approved by the Food and Drug Administration for the prevention of acute and delayed chemotherapy-induced nausea and vomiting, including highly emetogenic chemotherapy such as with cisplatin. In the European Union, the combinations are approved by the European Medicines Agency (EMA) for the same indication.

== Adverse effects ==
Side effects of the combination netupitant/palonosetron are similar to palonosetron alone, so that no common side effects can be attributed to netupitant.

== Interactions ==
Netupitant blood plasma levels are expected to increase when combined with inhibitors of the liver enzyme CYP3A4 and lowered when combined with inductors of this enzyme.

Being a CYP3A4 inhibitor itself, netupitant could also increase plasma levels of pharmaceuticals that are metabolized by CYP3A4. This effect has been observed with dexamethasone, the anti-cancer drugs docetaxel and etoposide, and to a minor (not clinically significant) extent with levonorgestrel, erythromycin and midazolam. The clinical relevance of the anti-cancer drug interactions has been questioned.

== Pharmacology ==
=== Mechanism of action ===
Netupitant is a selective NK_{1} receptor antagonist.

Netupitant is a selective neurokinin 1 (NK1) receptor antagonist with potential antiemetic activity. Netupitant competitively binds to and blocks the activity of the human substance P/NK1 receptors in the central nervous system (CNS), thereby inhibiting NK1-receptor binding of the endogenous tachykinin neuropeptide substance P (SP), which may result in the prevention of chemotherapy-induced nausea and vomiting (CINV). SP is found in neurons of vagal afferent fibers innervating the brain-stem nucleus tractus solitarii and the area postrema, which contains the chemoreceptor trigger zone (CTZ), and may be elevated in response to chemotherapy. The NK-receptor is a G-protein receptor coupled to the inositol phosphate signal-transduction pathway and is found in both the nucleus tractus solitarii and the area postrema.

=== Pharmacokinetics ===
Bioavailability is estimated to be over 60% for orally taken netupitant. Highest blood plasma concentrations are reached five hours after application. Availability is moderately (10–20%) increased when taken after a fatty meal. Netupitant and its main metabolites (called M1 and M3) are bound to plasma proteins to more than 99%, and M2 protein binding is 97%.

The substance is mainly metabolized by CYP3A4, and to a lesser extent by CYP2D6 and CYP2C9. The main metabolites are desmethyl-netupitant (M1), netupitant N-oxide (M2), and hydroxy-netupitant (M3); all three are pharmacologically active.

Netupitant and its metabolites are mainly excreted via the faeces. Biological half-life is 88 hours, significantly longer than that of the first NK_{1} receptor antagonist, aprepitant, which has a half-life of 9 to 13 hours.

Netupitant metabolites
