= Vofopitant =

Chemical compound

Clinical data
- Other names: GR205171; GR-205171
- Routes of administration: Oral
- ATC code: none

Identifiers
- IUPAC name: (2S,3S)-N-[(2-Methoxy-5-[5-(trifluoromethyl)tetrazol-1-yl]phenyl)methyl]-2-phenylpiperidin-3-amine
- CAS Number: 168266-90-8
- PubChem CID: 6918331
- IUPHAR/BPS: 5752
- ChemSpider: 5293535
- UNII: K08BK043YS
- CompTox Dashboard (EPA): DTXSID10870099

Chemical and physical data
- Formula: C_{21}H_{23}F_{3}N_{6}O
- Molar mass: 432.451 g·mol^{−1}
- 3D model (JSmol): Interactive image
- SMILES: COC1=C(C=C(C=C1)N2C(=NN=N2)C(F)(F)F)CN[C@H]3CCCN[C@H]3C4=CC=CC=C4
- InChI: InChI=1S/C21H23F3N6O/c1-31-18-10-9-16(30-20(21(22,23)24)27-28-29-30)12-15(18)13-26-17-8-5-11-25-19(17)14-6-3-2-4-7-14/h2-4,6-7,9-10,12,17,19,25-26H,5,8,11,13H2,1H3/t17-,19-/m0/s1; Key:XILNRORTJVDYRH-HKUYNNGSSA-N

Vofopitant (GR205171) is a drug which acts as an NK_{1} receptor antagonist. It has antiemetic effects as with other NK_{1} antagonists, and also shows anxiolytic actions in animals. It was studied for applications such as the treatment of social phobia and post-traumatic stress disorder, but did not prove sufficiently effective to be marketed.

== See also ==
- NK_{1} receptor antagonist
