= Tesaro =

American pharmaceutical company

Tesaro, Inc.
- Company type: Subsidiary
- Industry: Pharmaceuticals
- Founded: 2010; 15 years ago, in Waltham, Massachusetts
- Headquarters: Waltham, United States
- Products: Varubi
- Number of employees: 286 (2016)
- Parent: GSK (2019–present)
- Website: tesarobio.com

Tesaro Inc. is a pharmaceutical company based in Waltham, Massachusetts. They focus on drug development for cancer.

== History ==
Tesaro was founded in 2010. The company's first commercial product, Varubi, was approved by the FDA in October 2015. As of 2016, the company had 286 full-time employees, 59 of whom had a PhD or MD. The company's product Niraparib was granted priority review and was given a target action date of June 2017 by the FDA. In March 2017, Tesaro won approval for its drug Zejula to treat ovarian cancer. On May 31, 2017, it was reported that Tesaro Inc. was exploring a sale. On December 3, 2018, GSK announced it would acquire the company for $5.1 billion, and the deal was completed on January 22, 2019.

== Products under development ==
- Rolapitant – intravenous form in phase III clinical trials for use in chemotherapy-induced nausea and vomiting
- Niraparib – PARP inhibitor in clinical trials for breast and ovarian cancer.
- TSR-042
- TSR-022
- Dostarlimab – In February 2023, the FDA approved dostarlimab-gxly (Jemperli, GlaxoSmithKline LLC) for adults with mismatch repair deficient (dMMR) recurrent or advanced endometrial cancer, as determined by an FDA-approved test, that has progressed on or following a prior platinum-containing regimen in any setting and are not candidates for curative surgery or radiation.
