= Aprepitant =

Chemical compound

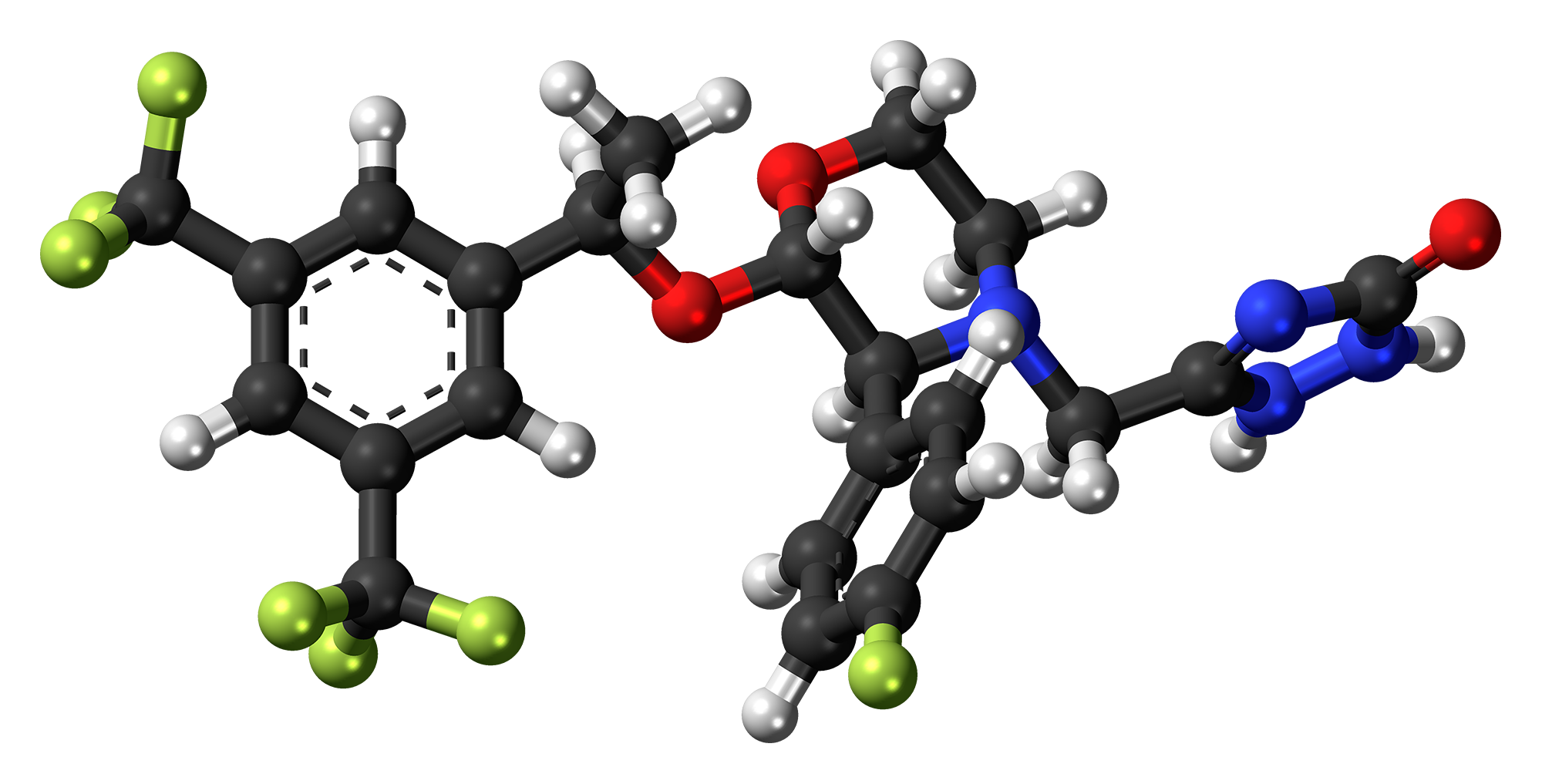

Clinical data
- Trade names: Emend, Cinvanti, Aponvie, others
- AHFS/Drugs.com: Monograph
- MedlinePlus: a604003
- License data: US DailyMed: Aprepitant
- Pregnancy category: AU: B1
- Routes of administration: By mouth
- Drug class: NK_{1} receptor antagonist, antiemetic
- ATC code: A04AD12 (WHO)

Legal status
- Legal status: AU: S4 (Prescription only); UK: POM (Prescription only); US: ℞-only; EU: Rx-only

Pharmacokinetic data
- Bioavailability: 60–65%
- Protein binding: >95%
- Metabolism: Liver (mostly CYP3A4- mediated; some contributions by CYP2C19 & CYP1A2)
- Elimination half-life: 9–13 hours
- Excretion: Kidney (57%), feces (45%)

Identifiers
- IUPAC name: 5-([(2R,3S)-2-((R)-1-[3,5-Bis(trifluoromethyl)phenyl]ethoxy)-3-(4-fluorophenyl)morpholino]methyl)-1H-1,2,4-triazol-3(2H)-one
- CAS Number: 170729-80-3
- PubChem CID: 6918365
- IUPHAR/BPS: 3490
- DrugBank: DB00673
- ChemSpider: 5293568
- UNII: 1NF15YR6UY
- ChEBI: CHEBI:499361
- ChEMBL: ChEMBL1471
- CompTox Dashboard (EPA): DTXSID3049047
- ECHA InfoCard: 100.202.762

Chemical and physical data
- Formula: C_{23}H_{21}F_{7}N_{4}O_{3}
- Molar mass: 534.435 g·mol^{−1}
- 3D model (JSmol): Interactive image
- SMILES: FC(F)(F)c1cc(cc(c1)C(F)(F)F)[C@H](O[C@H]4OCCN(CC/2=N/C(=O)NN\2)[C@H]4c3ccc(F)cc3)C
- InChI: InChI=1S/C23H21F7N4O3/c1-12(14-8-15(22(25,26)27)10-16(9-14)23(28,29)30)37-20-19(13-2-4-17(24)5-3-13)34(6-7-36-20)11-18-31-21(35)33-32-18/h2-5,8-10,12,19-20H,6-7,11H2,1H3,(H2,31,32,33,35)/t12-,19+,20-/m1/s1; Key:ATALOFNDEOCMKK-OITMNORJSA-N

Aprepitant, sold under the brand name Emend among others, is a medication used to prevent chemotherapy-induced nausea and vomiting and to prevent postoperative nausea and vomiting. It may be used together with ondansetron and dexamethasone. It is taken by mouth or administered by intravenous injection. A prodrug, fosaprepitant, is also available for intravenous administration.

Common side effects include tiredness, loss of appetite, diarrhea, abdominal pain, hiccups, itchiness, pneumonia, and blood pressure changes. Other severe side effects may include anaphylaxis. While use in pregnancy does not appear to be harmful, such use has not been well studied. Aprepitant belongs to the class of neurokinin-1 receptor antagonists. It works by blocking substance P from attaching to the NK_{1} receptors.

Aprepitant was approved for medical use in the European Union and the United States in 2003. It is made by Merck & Co. It is on the World Health Organization's List of Essential Medicines.

== Medical uses ==
Aprepitant is used to prevent chemotherapy-induced nausea and vomiting and to prevent postoperative nausea and vomiting. It may be used together with ondansetron and dexamethasone.

== Mechanism of action ==
Aprepitant is classified as an NK_{1} antagonist because it blocks signals given off by NK_{1} receptors. This, therefore, decreases the likelihood of vomiting in patients.

NK_{1} is a G protein-coupled receptor located in the central and peripheral nervous system. This receptor has a dominant ligand known as Substance P (SP). SP is a neuropeptide, composed of 11 amino acids, which sends impulses and messages from the brain. It is found in high concentrations in the vomiting center of the brain, and, when activated, it results in a vomiting reflex. In addition to this it also plays a key part in the transmission of pain impulses from the peripheral receptors to the central nervous system.

Aprepitant has been shown to inhibit both the acute and delayed emesis induced by cytotoxic chemotherapeutic drugs by blocking substance P landing on receptors in the brain's neurons. Positron emission tomography (PET) studies, have demonstrated that aprepitant can cross the blood–brain barrier and bind to NK_{1} receptors in the human brain. It has also been shown to increase the activity of the 5-HT_{3} receptor antagonist ondansetron and the corticosteroid dexamethasone, which are also used to prevent nausea and vomiting caused by chemotherapy.

In addition to its activity as an NK_{1} receptor antagonist, aprepitant has also been identified as a microtubule-targeting agent (MTA). A nanoDSF-based screen with follow-up assays showed that aprepitant binds tubulin and completely inhibits microtubule polymerization in vitro, placing it among MTAs widely used in anticancer therapy.

== Pharmacokinetics ==
Before clinical testing, a new class of therapeutic agent has to be characterized in terms of preclinical metabolism and excretion studies. Average bioavailability is found to be around 60–65%. Aprepitant is metabolized primarily by CYP3A4 with minor metabolism by CYP1A2 and CYP2C19. Seven metabolites of aprepitant, which are only weakly active, have been identified in human plasma. As a moderate inhibitor of CYP3A4, aprepitant can increase plasma concentrations of co-administered medicinal products that are metabolized through CYP3A4. Specific interaction has been demonstrated with oxycodone, where aprepitant both increased the efficacy and worsened the side effects of oxycodone; however it is unclear whether this is due to CYP3A4 inhibition or through its NK_{1} antagonist action. Following IV administration of a ^{14}C-labeled prodrug of aprepitant (L-758298), which is converted rapidly and completely to aprepitant, approximately 57% of the total radioactivity is excreted in the urine and 45% in feces. No unchanged substance is excreted in urine.

== Structure and properties ==
Aprepitant is made up of a morpholine core with two substituents attached to adjacent ring carbons. These substitute groups are trifluoromethylated 1-phenylethanol and fluorophenyl group. Aprepitant also has a third substituent (triazolinone), which is joined to the morpholine ring nitrogen. It has three chiral centres very close together, which combine to produce an amino acetal arrangement. Its empirical formula is C_{23}H_{21}F_{7}N_{4}O_{3}.

== Synthesis ==
Shortly after Merck initiated research into reducing the severity and likelihood of chemotherapy-induced nausea and vomiting, researchers discovered that aprepitant is effective in prevention. Researchers worked on coming up with a process to create aprepitant, and within a short period they came up with effective synthesis of the substance. This original synthesis was deemed to be workable and proved to be a crucial step in achieving commercialization; however, Merck decided that the process was not environmentally sustainable. This was due to the original synthesis requiring six steps, many of which needed dangerous chemicals such as sodium cyanide, dimethyltitanocene, and gaseous ammonia. In addition to this, for the process to be effective cryogenic temperatures were needed for some of the steps and other steps produced hazardous byproducts such as methane. The environmental concerns of the synthesis of aprepitant became so great that Merck research team decided to withdraw the drug from clinical trials and attempt to create a different synthesis of aprepitant.

The gamble of taking the drug out of clinical trials proved to be successful when shortly afterwards the team of Merck researchers came up with an alternative and more environmentally friendly synthesis of aprepitant. The new process works by four compounds of similar size and complexity being fused together. This therefore is a much simpler process and requires only three steps, half the number of the original synthesis.

The new process begins by enantiopure trifluoromethylated phenyl ethanol being joined to a racemic morpholine precursor. This results in the desired isomer crystallizing on the top of the solution and the unwanted isomer remaining in the solution. The unwanted isomer is then converted to the desired isomer through a crystallization-induced asymmetric transformation. By the end of this step a secondary amine, the base of the drug, is formed.

The second step involves the fluorophenyl group being attached to the morpholine ring. Once this has been achieved the third and final step can be initiated. This step involves a side chain of triazolinone being added to the ring. Once this step is successfully completed a stable molecule of aprepitant has been produced.

This more streamlined route yields around 76% more aprepitant than the original process and reduces the operating cost by a significant amount. In addition, the new process also reduces the amount of solvent and reagents required by about 80% and saving an estimated 340,000 L per ton of aprepitant produced.

The improvements in the synthesis process have also decreased the long-term detriment to the natural environment associated with the original procedure, due to eliminating the use of several hazardous chemicals.

== History ==
It was approved by the US Food and Drug Administration (FDA) in 2003. In 2008, fosaprepitant, an intravenous form of aprepitant was approved in the United States.

== Research ==
=== Major depression ===
Plans to develop aprepitant as an antidepressant have been withdrawn. Subsequently, other trials with NK_{1} receptor antagonists, casopitant and orvepitant, have shown promising results.

Beyond suggestions that PET receptor occupancy must not be used routinely to cap dosing for new medical indications for this class, or that > 99% human receptor occupancy might be required for consistent psycho-pharmacological or other therapeutic effects, critical scientific dissection and debate of the above data might be needed to enable aprepitant, and the class of NK_{1} antagonists as a whole, to fulfill preclinically predicted utilities beyond chemotherapy-induced nausea and vomiting (i.e., for other psychiatric disorders, addictions, neuropathic pain, migraine, osteoarthritis, overactive bladder, inflammatory bowel disease and other disorders with suspected inflammatory or immunological components). However, most data remain proprietary and thus reviews on the expanded clinical potential for drugs like aprepitant range from optimistic to poor.

=== Cannabinoid hyperemesis syndrome ===
Aprepitant has been identified as having strong potential in treating protracted vomiting episodes in individuals with cannabinoid hyperemesis syndrome. This syndrome is characterized by nausea, cyclical vomiting, and cramping abdominal pain resulting from prolonged, frequent cannabis use.

Standard first-line antiemetics such as ondansetron and prochlorperazine are often ineffective in treating cannabinoid hyperemesis syndrome.
