= Orvepitant =

Chemical compound

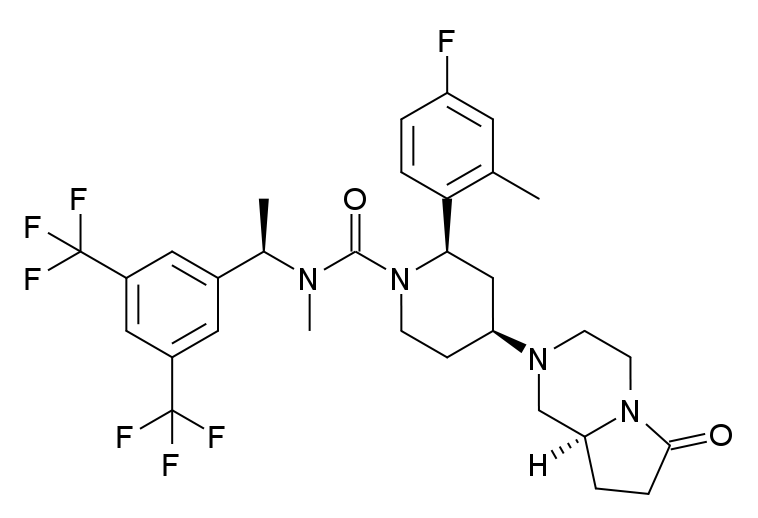

Clinical data
- ATC code: none

Identifiers
- IUPAC name: (2R,4S)-4-[(8aS)-6-oxo-1,3,4,7,8,8a-hexahydropyrrolo[1,2-a]pyrazin-2-yl]-N-[(1R)-1-[3,5-bis(trifluoromethyl)phenyl]ethyl]-2-(4-fluoro-2-methylphenyl)-N-methylpiperidine-1-carboxamide
- CAS Number: 579475-18-6
- PubChem CID: 9852175
- ChemSpider: 8027888
- UNII: IIU6V0W3JD
- CompTox Dashboard (EPA): DTXSID40973522

Chemical and physical data
- Formula: C_{31}H_{35}F_{7}N_{4}O_{2}
- Molar mass: 628.636 g·mol^{−1}
- 3D model (JSmol): Interactive image
- SMILES: CC1=C(C=CC(=C1)F)[C@H]2C[C@H](CCN2C(=O)N(C)[C@H](C)C3=CC(=CC(=C3)C(F)(F)F)C(F)(F)F)N4CCN5[C@H](C4)CCC5=O
- InChI: InChI=1S/C31H35F7N4O2/c1-18-12-23(32)4-6-26(18)27-16-24(40-10-11-41-25(17-40)5-7-28(41)43)8-9-42(27)29(44)39(3)19(2)20-13-21(30(33,34)35)15-22(14-20)31(36,37)38/h4,6,12-15,19,24-25,27H,5,7-11,16-17H2,1-3H3/t19-,24+,25+,27-/m1/s1; Key:XWNBGDJPEXZSQM-VZOBGQTKSA-N

Orvepitant (GW823296) is a drug developed by GlaxoSmithKline which acts as a selective antagonist for the NK_{1} receptor. It was under development as a potential antidepressant drug, and early stage human clinical trials showed it to have some antidepressant effects, though not with sufficient efficacy to justify further development for this application. It was however considered a successful proof of concept for NK_{1} antagonists as potential antidepressants, and efforts are continuing to find more potent compounds which might be more effective.
