= Lanepitant =

Chemical compound

Clinical data
- Other names: LY303870; N-[(R)-2-Indol-3-yl-1-[[N-(o-methoxybenzyl)acetamido]methyl]ethyl][1,4'-bipiperidine]-1'-acetamide
- ATC code: None

Identifiers
- IUPAC name: N-[(2R)-1-[Acetyl-[(2-methoxyphenyl)methyl] amino]-3-(1H-indol-3-yl)propan-2-yl]-2-(4-piperidin-1-ylpiperidin-1-yl)acetamide
- CAS Number: 170566-84-4
- PubChem CID: 3086681
- ChemSpider: 2343246
- UNII: 17G8FN2E1F
- ChEMBL: ChEMBL42407
- CompTox Dashboard (EPA): DTXSID80168879

Chemical and physical data
- Formula: C_{33}H_{45}N_{5}O_{3}
- Molar mass: 559.755 g·mol^{−1}
- 3D model (JSmol): Interactive image
- SMILES: CC(=O)N(CC1=CC=CC=C1OC)C[C@@H](CC2=CNC3=CC=CC=C32)NC(=O)CN4CCC(CC4)N5CCCCC5
- InChI: InChI=1S/C33H45N5O3/c1-25(39)38(22-26-10-4-7-13-32(26)41-2)23-28(20-27-21-34-31-12-6-5-11-30(27)31)35-33(40)24-36-18-14-29(15-19-36)37-16-8-3-9-17-37/h4-7,10-13,21,28-29,34H,3,8-9,14-20,22-24H2,1-2H3,(H,35,40)/t28-/m1/s1; Key:CVXJAPZTZWLRBP-MUUNZHRXSA-N

Lanepitant (INN, code name LY303870), developed by Eli Lilly, is a drug which acts as a selective antagonist of the NK_{1} receptor, and was one of the first compounds developed that act at this target. It was under development as a potential analgesic drug, but despite promising results in initial animal studies, human clinical trials against migraine, arthritis and diabetic neuropathy all failed to show sufficient efficacy to support further development, with the drug being only marginally more effective than placebo and inferior to older comparison drugs such as naproxen. Failure of analgesic action was thought to be due to poor penetration of the blood–brain barrier in humans, but research has continued into potential applications in the treatment of other disorders with a peripheral site of action, such as corneal neovascularization.
