= Fosaprepitant =

Chemical compound

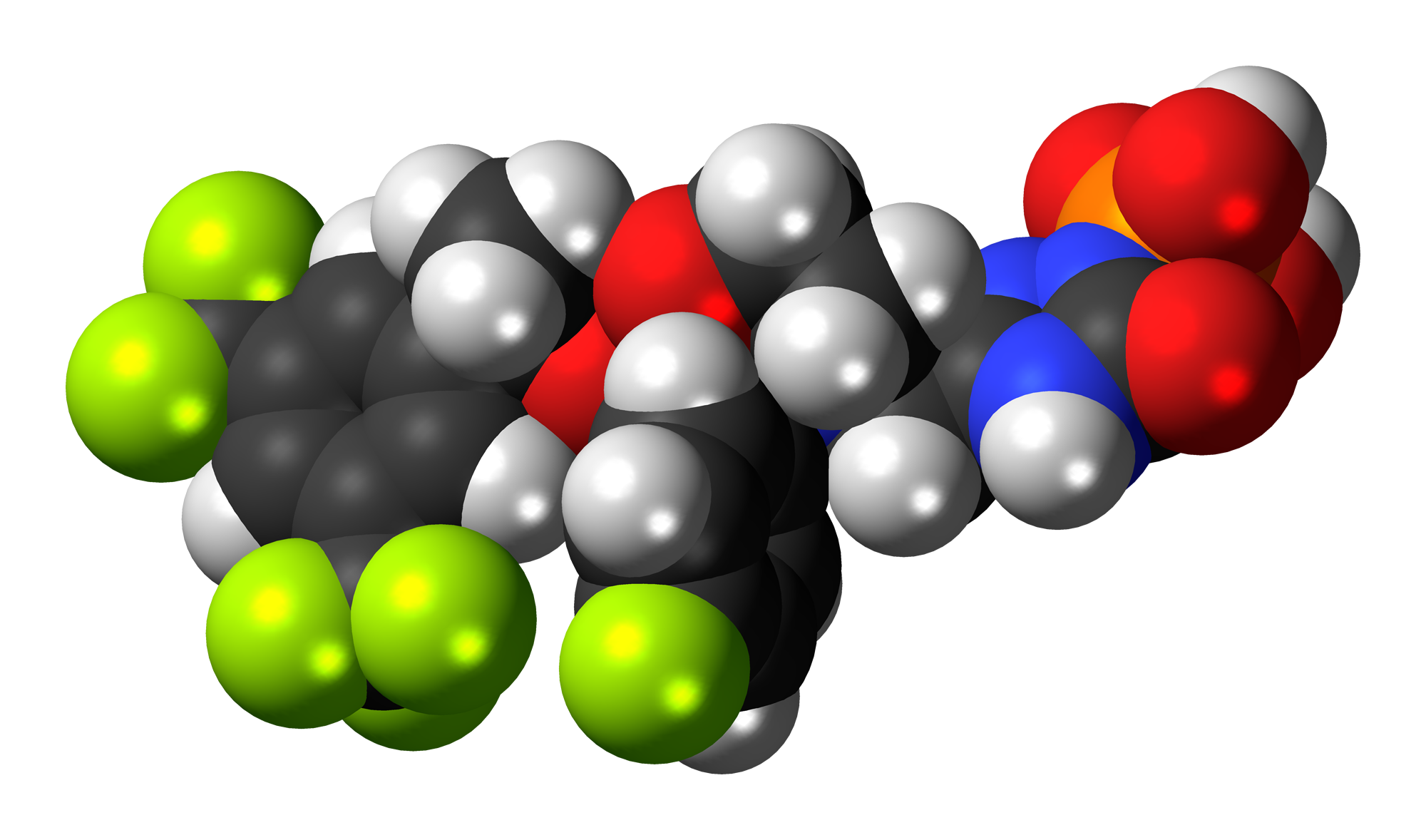

Clinical data
- Trade names: Emend, Ivemend, others
- Other names: Fosaprepitant meglumine (JAN JP), Fosaprepitant dimeglumine (USAN US)
- AHFS/Drugs.com: Micromedex Detailed Consumer Information
- MedlinePlus: a604003
- License data: US DailyMed: Fosaprepitant
- Pregnancy category: AU: B2
- Routes of administration: Intravenous
- Drug class: Antiemetic agent
- ATC code: A04AD12 (WHO)

Legal status
- Legal status: AU: S4 (Prescription only); CA: ℞-only; UK: POM (Prescription only); US: ℞-only; EU: Rx-only

Pharmacokinetic data
- Bioavailability: n/a
- Protein binding: >95% (aprepitant)
- Metabolism: To aprepitant
- Elimination half-life: 9 to 13 hours (aprepitant)

Identifiers
- IUPAC name: [3-{[(2R,3S)-2-[(1R)-1-[3,5-bis(trifluoromethyl)phenyl] ethoxy]-3-(4-fluorophenyl)morpholin-4-yl]methyl}-5-oxo- 2H-1,2,4-triazol-1-yl]phosphonic acid
- CAS Number: 172673-20-0; 265121-04-8
- PubChem CID: 135413538; 135564864
- IUPHAR/BPS: 7623
- DrugBank: DB06717
- ChemSpider: 189912
- UNII: 6L8OF9XRDC; D35FM8T64X
- KEGG: D10895; D06597
- ChEBI: CHEBI:64321; CHEBI:64311
- ChEMBL: ChEMBL1199324; ChEMBL1201782
- CompTox Dashboard (EPA): DTXSID801021651

Chemical and physical data
- Formula: C_{23}H_{22}F_{7}N_{4}O_{6}P
- Molar mass: 614.414 g·mol^{−1}
- 3D model (JSmol): Interactive image; Interactive image
- SMILES: C[C@H](c1cc(cc(c1)C(F)(F)F)C(F)(F)F)O[C@@H]2[C@@H](N(CCO2)Cc3[nH]c(=O)n(n3)P(=O)(O)O)c4ccc(cc4)F; C[C@H](C1=CC(=CC(=C1)C(F)(F)F)C(F)(F)F)O[C@@H]2[C@@H](N(CCO2)CC3=NN(C(=O)N3)P(=O)(O)O)C4=CC=C(C=C4)F.CNC[C@@H]([C@H]([C@@H]([C@@H](CO)O)O)O)O.CNC[C@@H]([C@H]([C@@H]([C@@H](CO)O)O)O)O
- InChI: InChI=1S/C23H22F7N4O6P/c1-12(14-8-15(22(25,26)27)10-16(9-14)23(28,29)30)40-20-19(13-2-4-17(24)5-3-13)33(6-7-39-20)11-18-31-21(35)34(32-18)41(36,37)38/h2-5,8-10,12,19-20H,6-7,11H2,1H3,(H,31,32,35)(H2,36,37,38)/t12-,19+,20-/m1/s1; Key:BARDROPHSZEBKC-OITMNORJSA-N; InChI=1S/C23H22F7N4O6P.2C7H17NO5/c1-12(14-8-15(22(25,26)27)10-16(9-14)23(28,29)30)40-20-19(13-2-4-17(24)5-3-13)33(6-7-39-20)11-18-31-21(35)34(32-18)41(36,37)38;2*1-8-2-4(10)6(12)7(13)5(11)3-9/h2-5,8-10,12,19-20H,6-7,11H2,1H3,(H,31,32,35)(H2,36,37,38);2*4-13H,2-3H2,1H3/t12-,19+,20-;2*4-,5+,6+,7+/m100/s1; Key:VRQHBYGYXDWZDL-OOZCZQCLSA-N

Fosaprepitant, sold under the brand names Emend (US) and Ivemend (EU) among others, is an antiemetic medication, administered intravenously. Fosaprepitant is a substance P/neurokinin-1 (NK_{1}) receptor antagonist. It is a prodrug of aprepitant.

Fosaprepitant was developed by Merck & Co. and was approved for medical use in the United States, and in the European Union in January 2008.

== Medical uses ==
Fosaprepitant is indicated for people aged six months of age and older, in combination with other antiemetic agents, for the prevention of acute and delayed nausea and vomiting associated with initial and repeat courses of highly emetogenic cancer chemotherapy including high-dose cisplatin; and for delayed nausea and vomiting associated with initial and repeat courses of moderately emetogenic cancer chemotherapy.
