= ATC code A04 =

ATC code A04 Antiemetics and antinauseants is a therapeutic subgroup of the Anatomical Therapeutic Chemical Classification System, a system of alphanumeric codes developed by the World Health Organization (WHO) for the classification of drugs and other medical products. Subgroup A04 is part of the anatomical group A Alimentary tract and metabolism.

Codes for veterinary use (ATCvet codes) can be created by placing the letter Q in front of the human ATC code: for example, QA04. ATCvet codes without corresponding human ATC codes are cited with the leading Q in the following list.
National versions of the ATC classification may include additional codes not present in this list, which follows the WHO version.

== A04A Antiemetics and antinauseants ==
=== A04AA Serotonin (5-HT_{3}) antagonists ===
A04AA01 Ondansetron
A04AA02 Granisetron
A04AA03 Tropisetron
A04AA04 Dolasetron
A04AA05 Palonosetron
A04AA55 Palonosetron, combinations

=== A04AD Other antiemetics ===
A04AD01 Scopolamine
A04AD02 Cerium oxalate
A04AD04 Chlorobutanol
A04AD05 Metopimazine
A04AD10 Dronabinol
A04AD11 Nabilone
A04AD12 Aprepitant
A04AD13 Casopitant
A04AD14 Rolapitant
A04AD51 Scopolamine, combinations
A04AD54 Chlorobutanol, combinations
QA04AD90 Maropitant
