= Maropitant =

Veterinary medication

Clinical data
- Pronunciation: /məˈrɒpɪtænt/ mə-ROP-i-tant
- Trade names: Cerenia, others
- Other names: (2S,3S)-2-Benzhydryl-N-(5-tert-butyl-2-methoxybenzyl) quinuclidin-3-amine, maropitant citrate (USAN US)
- AHFS/Drugs.com: Veterinary Use
- License data: US DailyMed: Maropitant
- Routes of administration: Oral, subcutaneous, Intravenous transdermal
- Drug class: Antiemetic
- ATCvet code: QA04AD90 (WHO)

Legal status
- Legal status: CA: ℞-only; US: ℞-only; EU: Rx-only

Pharmacokinetic data
- Bioavailability: Oral: 20–30% dogs, 50% cats SQ: 90% (both)
- Protein binding: 99.5%
- Metabolism: Liver (CYP3A12 and CYP2D15)
- Metabolites: CJ-18,518
- Elimination half-life: 6–8 hours (SQ)
- Duration of action: 24 hours (SQ)

Identifiers
- IUPAC name: (2S,3S)-N-(5-tert-Butyl-2-methoxybenzyl)-2-(diphenylmethyl)-1-azabicyclo[2.2.2]octan-3-amine
- CAS Number: 147116-67-4
- PubChem CID: 23724948
- ChemSpider: 176804
- UNII: 4XE2T9H4DH
- KEGG: D04860
- ChEMBL: ChEMBL2107353
- CompTox Dashboard (EPA): DTXSID1057874

Chemical and physical data
- Formula: C_{32}H_{40}N_{2}O
- Molar mass: 468.685 g·mol^{−1}
- 3D model (JSmol): Interactive image
- SMILES: O=C(O)C(O)(CC(=O)O)CC(=O)O.O.O(c1ccc(cc1CN[C@@H]2[C@@H](N3CCC2CC3)C(c4ccccc4)c5ccccc5)C(C)(C)C)C
- InChI: InChI=1S/C32H40N2O.C6H8O7.H2O/c1-32(2,3)27-15-16-28(35-4)26(21-27)22-33-30-25-17-19-34(20-18-25)31(30)29(23-11-7-5-8-12-23)24-13-9-6-10-14-24;7-3(8)1-6(13,5(11)12)2-4(9)10;/h5-16,21,25,29-31,33H,17-20,22H2,1-4H3;13H,1-2H2,(H,7,8)(H,9,10)(H,11,12);1H2/t30-,31-;;/m0../s1; Key:PGVSXRHFXJOMGW-YBZGWEFGSA-N

Maropitant , sold under the brand name Cerenia among others, when used as maropitant citrate (USAN), is a neurokinin-1 (NK_{1}) receptor antagonist developed by Zoetis specifically for the treatment of motion sickness and vomiting in dogs. It was approved by the FDA in 2007, for use in dogs and in 2012, for cats.

Maropitant mildly reduces intra-procedural inhaled anesthesia dose requirements but does not confer analgesia itself.

== Veterinary uses ==
Injectable maropitant is used in dogs to treat and prevent acute vomiting; tablets are used for preventing vomiting from a variety of causes, though it requires a higher dose to prevent vomiting from motion sickness. The injectable version is also licensed for preventing and treating acute vomiting in cats.

Maropitant is effective in treating vomiting from a variety of causes, including gastroenteritis, chemotherapy, and kidney failure; when given beforehand, it can prevent vomiting caused by using an opioid as a premedication. Some have claimed that maropitant is better at treating vomiting than nausea, pointing to cats with chronic kidney disease who, when receiving maropitant, had a reduction in vomiting but no corresponding increase in appetite.

Maropitant has been used in acute cases of rapid or labored breathing to prevent vomiting that could lead to aspiration pneumonia. It has been given in combination with a benzodiazepine to cats prior to stressful events (such as a veterinary visit) to possibly relieve hypersensitivity.

When compared to other antiemetics, maropitant has similar or greater effectiveness to chlorpromazine and metoclopramide for centrally mediated vomiting induced by apomorphine or xylazine. It works better than chlorpromazine and metoclopramide for vomiting peripherally induced induced with syrup of ipecac. Unlike dimenhydrinate and acepromazine, which are used for motion sickness, maropitant does not cause sedation.

Maropitant has been used as an adjunct treatment in severe bronchitis due to its weak anti-inflammatory effects. It alleviates visceral pain and has been found to reduce the amount of general anesthesia (both sevoflurane and isoflurane) needed in some operations.

Some believe that maropitant can be used in rabbits and guinea pigs to relieve pain caused by ileus (impaired bowel movements), though it lacks antiemetic effects in rabbits, who cannot vomit.

Maropitant is given orally, subcutaneously, and intravenously.

== Contraindications ==
Maropitant is only indicated for dogs at least 16 weeks old, as some very young puppies suffered bone marrow hypoplasia (incomplete development ). It should also be used with caution in animals with suspected GI obstruction or toxin ingestion, as it can mask symptoms, thereby delaying the diagnosis.

It is not recommended to give maropitant for more than five consecutive days, as it tends to accumulate in the body due to one of the liver enzymes responsible for its metabolism, CYP2D15, becoming saturated. However, there have been studies where beagles who were given maropitant for two weeks in a row showed no signs of toxicity.

Because maropitant is metabolized by the liver, caution should be taken when giving it to dogs with liver dysfunction. Caution should also be taken when giving it with other drugs that are also highly protein-bound, such as NSAIDs, anticonvulsants, and some behavior-modifying drugs; such drugs compete with maropitant for binding to plasma proteins, increasing the concentration of unbound maropitant in the blood. Maropitant should also not be used with calcium channel antagonists (used to treat high blood pressure) or in animals with heart disease, as it has a slight affinity for calcium and potassium channels.

== Side effects ==
Maropitant is safer than other antiemetics used in veterinary medicine, in part because of its high specificity for its target and thus not binding to other receptors in the central nervous system. Side effects in dogs and cats include hypersalivation, diarrhea, loss of appetite, and vomiting. Eight percent of dogs taking maropitant at doses meant to prevent motion sickness vomited right after, likely due to the local effects maropitant had on the gastrointestinal tract. Small amounts of food beforehand can prevent such post-administration vomiting.

One of the most common side effects of subcutaneous administration is moderate to severe pain at the injection site. Although the manufacturer recommends keeping maropitant at room temperature, many people have noted that keeping it in the fridge reduces the sting upon injection. Only unbound maropitant causes pain – it is normally formulated with beta-cyclodextrin to increase solubility; at cooler temperatures, more of the maropitant remains bound to the cyclodextrin, leaving less maropitant unbound.

While there is no pain related to the intravenous administration of maropitant, pushing a dose in too quickly can temporarily reduce blood pressure.

Fewer than 1 in 10,000 dogs and cats experience anaphylactic reactions.

== Overdose ==
Signs of maropitant overdose include lethargy, irregular or labored breathing, lack of muscle coordination, and tremors. Overdose of the oral formulation can cause salivation and nasal discharge, while overdose of intravenous maropitant can sometimes lead to reddish urine. The LD_{50} is high, being over 2,000 mg/kg for oral maropitant in rats.

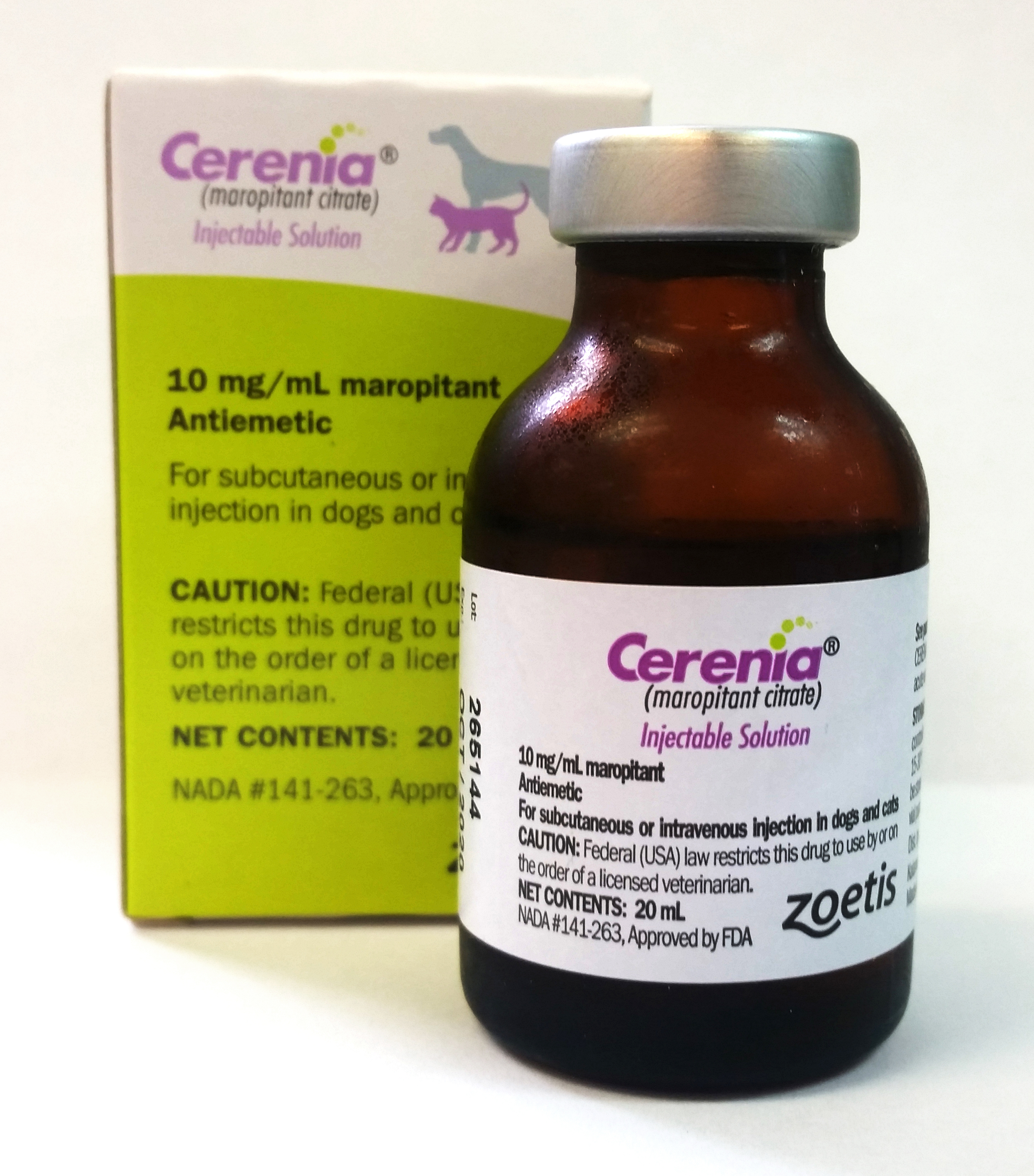
Packaging of injectable maropitant (Cerenia), as sold by Zoetis

== Pharmacology ==
=== Mechanism of action ===
Vomiting is caused when impulses from the chemoreceptor trigger zone (CRTZ) in the brain are sent to the vomiting center in the medulla. Motion sickness specifically occurs when signals to the CRTZ originate from the inner ear: motion is sensed by the fluid of the semicircular canals, which causes overstimulation. The signal travels to the brain's vestibular nuclei, then to the CRTZ, and finally to the vomiting center.

Maropitant has a similar structure to substance P, the key neurotransmitter in causing vomiting, which allows it to act as an antagonist and bind to the substance P receptor neurokinin 1 (NK_{1}). It is highly selective for NK_{1} over NK_{2} and NK_{3}. Maropitant binds to the neurokinin receptors in the vagus nerves leaving the GI tract, as well as to receptors in the CRTZ and the vomiting center. By virtue of working at the last step in triggering vomiting, it can prevent a broader range of stimuli than most antiemetics can. It is effective against emetogens that act at the central nervous system (such as apomorphine in dogs and xylazine in cats), those that act in the periphery (e.g. syrup of ipecac), and those that act in both (e.g. cisplatin).

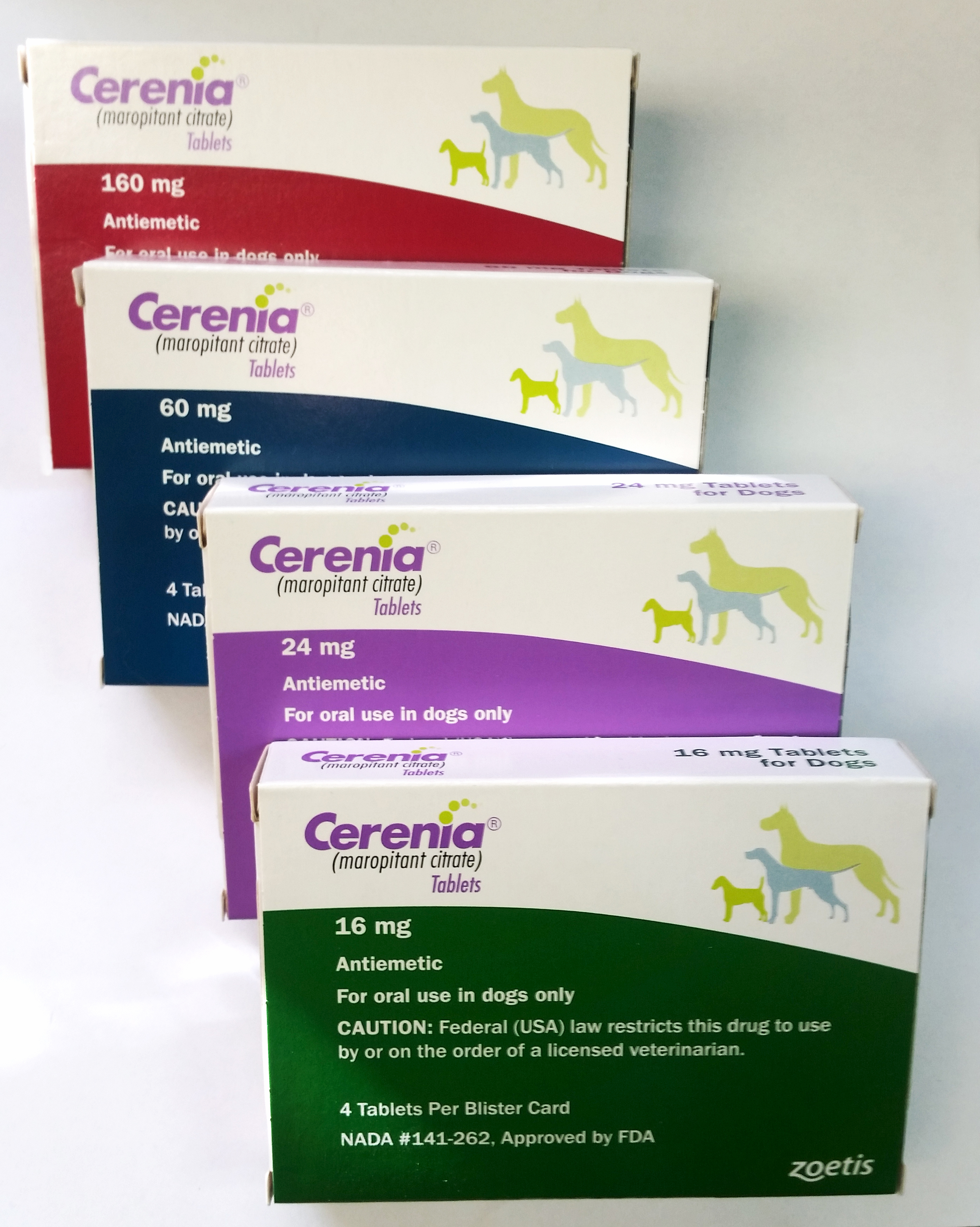
Packaging of oral maropitant

=== Pharmacokinetics ===
Maropitant's bioavailability is unaffected by the presence of food. Bioavailability is 91% at the standard subcutaneous dose but 24% at the standard oral dose; the standard oral dose is higher to partially compensate for incomplete bioavailability. It binds to plasma proteins at a rate of 99.5%; it has a low volume of distribution (9 L/kg) and is thus not extensively absorbed. Subcutaneously administered maropitant had peak plasma concentration around half an hour after administration; the mean half-life is 6–8 hours, and a single dose lasts 24 hours in dogs. Orally administered maropitant reached its peak plasma concentration within two hours.

Maropitant undergoes 1st-pass metabolism by liver enzymes, mainly CYP2D15 (which has high affinity for maropitant and clears over 90% of it) but also by the lower-affinity CYP3A12. Repeat dosing of maropitant eventually saturates CYP2D15, causing the drug to accumulate due to reduced clearance. Thus, it is recommended to not use maropitant for more than five days straight, and to have a two-day rest period to allow maropitant to clear the body to prevent accumulation. Maropitant has over 21 metabolites, though its major one (produced by hydroxylation) is CJ-18,518.

Maropitant clearance is slower in cats.

== Society and culture ==
=== Legal status ===
In February 2025, the Committee for Veterinary Medicinal Products (CVMP) of the European Medicines Agency adopted a positive opinion, recommending the granting of a marketing authorization for the veterinary medicinal product Elmaro for cats and dogs. The applicant for this veterinary medicinal product is Elanco GmbH. Elmaro is a generic of Cerenia, which has been authorized in the EU since June 2006.

In April 2025, the CVMP adopted a positive opinion, recommending the granting of a marketing authorization for the veterinary medicinal product Emevet, chewable tablet, intended for dogs. The applicant for this veterinary medicinal product is CP-Pharma Handelsgesellschaft mbH.

In February 2026, the CVMP adopted a positive opinion, recommending the granting of a marketing authorization for the veterinary medicinal product Emepax, Chewable tablet, intended for dogs. The applicant for this veterinary medicinal product is Axience. The applicant is registered as an SME pursuant to the definition set out in Commission Recommendation 2003/361/EC.

=== Names ===
Maropitant is the international nonproprietary name.

Maropitant is sold under the brand names Cerenia, Elmaro, and Emevet.
