= Casopitant =

Chemical compound

Clinical data
- Other names: GW679769; GW-679769; (2R,4S)-4-(4-Acetylpiperazin-1-yl)-N-{(1R)-1-[3,5-bis(trifluoromethyl)phenyl]ethyl}-2-(4-fluoro-2-methylphenyl)-N-methylpiperidine-1-carboxamide
- ATC code: A04AD13 (WHO)

Identifiers
- IUPAC name: (2S,4S)-4-(4-Acetyl-1-piperazinyl)-N-[(1R)-1-[3,5-bis(trifluoromethyl)phenyl]ethyl]-2-(4-fluoro-2-methylphenyl)-N-methyl-1-piperidinecarboxamide
- CAS Number: 414910-27-3
- PubChem CID: 23725089
- ChemSpider: 25069049
- UNII: 3B03KPM27L
- KEGG: D06574
- ChEMBL: ChEMBL2107320
- CompTox Dashboard (EPA): DTXSID40961762

Chemical and physical data
- Formula: C_{30}H_{35}F_{7}N_{4}O_{2}
- Molar mass: 616.625 g·mol^{−1}
- 3D model (JSmol): Interactive image
- SMILES: CC1=C(C=CC(=C1)F)[C@@H]2C[C@H](CCN2C(=O)N(C)[C@H](C)C3=CC(=CC(=C3)C(F)(F)F)C(F)(F)F)N4CCN(CC4)C(=O)C
- InChI: InChI=1S/C30H35F7N4O2/c1-18-13-24(31)5-6-26(18)27-17-25(40-11-9-39(10-12-40)20(3)42)7-8-41(27)28(43)38(4)19(2)21-14-22(29(32,33)34)16-23(15-21)30(35,36)37/h5-6,13-16,19,25,27H,7-12,17H2,1-4H3/t19-,25-,27+/m1/s1; Key:XGGTZCKQRWXCHW-JRLVAEJTSA-N

Casopitant (INN), former tentative trade names Rezonic (U.S.) and Zunrisa (Europe), is an NK_{1} receptor antagonist which was undergoing research for the treatment of chemotherapy-induced nausea and vomiting. It was under development by GlaxoSmithKline. In July 2008, the company filed a marketing authorisation application with the European Medicines Agency. The application was withdrawn and development was discontinued in September 2009 because GlaxoSmithKline decided that further safety assessment was necessary. However, a 2022 review listed casopitant as under development as a potential novel antidepressant for the treatment of major depressive disorder, with a phase 2 clinical trial having been completed.
