= Nicholas Blurton-Jones =

British anthropologist (1938–2026)

- Nicholas Blurton-Jones (first from right) interviewing a Hadza great-grandmother (second from left) in 1999.
- Born: 1938; Weymouth, Dorset, United Kingdom
- Died: June 8, 2026 (aged 90)
- Education: University of Reading (B.S., 1958); University of Oxford (Ph.D., 1961)
- Known for: Grandmother hypothesis, Ethnology of kinship, Human birth spacing
- Scientific career
- Fields: Evolutionary anthropology, behavioral ecology
- Workplaces: University of California, Los Angeles; UCL Institute of Child Health; University of Oxford
- Thesis: Motivation studies with birds with special reference to conflict and thwarting (1964)
- Doctoral advisor: Nikolaas Tinbergen

Nicholas G. Blurton-Jones (1938 – 8 June 2026) was a British biologist and evolutionary anthropologist known for his extensive ethnographic research on child development, the Grandmother hypothesis, and the behavioral ecology of modern foragers. He was a Professor Emeritus in the Departments of Psychiatry and Anthropology at the University of California, Los Angeles, and earlier the Department of Growth and Development at the Institute of Child Health (ICH), Great Ormond Street Hospital for Children, which later merged with University College London. In 2021, he was elected a Fellow of the American Association for the Advancement of Science in the Section of Anthropology, for his contributions to the field.

== Early life and education ==
Blurton-Jones was born in Weymouth Parish, Dorset in 1936. He attended Leighton Park School, where he first acquired an interest in ornithology after joining a birdwatching club organized by the school's botanist headmaster, John Ounsted. In 1954 he enrolled at the University of Reading, pursuing a BSc with a focus in Zoology, Botany, and Psychology. During the summer before his first year at university, he performed the first field census on Canadian geese for the Edward Grey Institute of Field Ornithology, in the Department of Zoology at the University of Oxford. The project was funded by a grant from the British Trust for Ornithology, and the young Blurton-Jones was assisted by the ornithologists Peter Scott and Wilfrid Backhouse Alexander, the Institute's director at the time. The report was published in 1955.

Blurton-Jones received his BSc in 1958 and stayed on in the Department of Zoology, starting a PhD under the Dutch biologist Nikolaas Tinbergen in the ornithology group of the British evolutionary biologist and ethologist David Lack, the Department's director at the time. Blurton-Jones' thesis fieldwork on the threat displays of Parus major while under Tinbergen are part of the body of contributions for which the latter shared the 1973 Nobel Prize in Physiology or Medicine with the ethologists Karl von Frisch and Konrad Lorenz. He successfully defended his PhD in 1961.

== Career and research ==
In 1960, while still working under Tinbergen, Blurton-Jones had a chance conversation with Eileen Molony and the British conservationist John Burton while visiting the BBC Natural History Unit. The two suggested that ethologists should verge into studying human behavior, particularly that of young children in the relatively controlled environment of nursery school. He then arranged access to suitable facility through the College of Further Education in Oxford, and after several interruptions involving ethnographic fieldwork with indigenous foragers in Africa, ended up in the Institute of Child Health (ICH), at the time the largest center for children's health research in Europe. He established a childhood development research lab under the department of pediatrician James Mourilyan Tanner, who had sought an ethologist for such a project.

The Institute for Child Health, at Great Ormond Street Children's Hospital in London.

Blurton-Jones' first work on foragers was with the San people of the Kalahari desert in modern Botswana, in collaboraiton with the anthropologist Melvin Konner, who began studying the child raising practices of San communities during the same period. During this period Blurton-Jones explored the use of formal evolutionary modeling of child development, kinship, and cross-cultural study of parent-child interactions. Notably, he also published comparisons between modern foraging communities such as the Hadza of Tanzania and the ǃKung of the Kalahari desert with urban populations in London, including his work on children at the ICH.

=== Development of evolutionary demography ===
In 1979, while a senior lecturer at the ICH, Blurton-Jones and British evolutionary biologist Richard Sibly applied evolutionary modeling to extensive ethnographic data on the !Kung produced by Harvard anthropologists Richard Borshay Lee and Nancy Howell Lee, particularly claims by the latter regarding birth spacing. In one of the first evolutionary demographic (later also called biodemography) studies, they modeled how selection acts on birth spacing as a function of resource scarcity in women practicing foraging lifestyles, and their results (and the modeling approach more generally) are now referred to as Blurton-Jones's ‘backload model’. The study was inspired by his time working under Lack, who famously first modeled bird clutch sizes (i.e., the number of eggs laid together in a group) as response curves, maximizing the average number of surviving offpsring in a clutch as a function of available resources. The resulting conclusion is that natural selection will favor lineages who balance between not producing enough offspring to take full advantage of available resources, and producing too many eggs such that some offspring perish before maturity, wasting the energetic investment of reproduction. This model has been generalized to a biological rule known as Lack's principle and was a significant step in the history of evolutionary thought. It is commonly considered to have sparked the debate between group selection (originated from figures such as V. C. Wynne-Edwards) and the gene-centered view of evolution, the latter of which has generally reached consensus.

=== Ethnography on Hadza communities ===
Along with American anthropologists and long-time collaborators Kristen Hawkes and James F. O'Connell, Blurton-Jones co-authored many scientific papers on the social and behavioral ecology of Hadza communities, including analyses of sexual division of labor, the cost of pregnancy and childrearing, strategies of butchering and the archaeology of faunal assemblages, and the social life history of Hadza women.

His 2016 book Demography and Evolutionary Ecology of Hadza Hunter-Gatherers covers over 16 years of fieldwork with the Hadza from Blurton-Jones as well as Hawkes and O'Connell, and is considered a major work in modern anthropological ethnography and a reference for cross-cultural anthropology. In addition to fieldwork, also contains a systematic literature review going back to ethnographies of the early 20th century.

== Contributions to evolutionary anthropology ==
=== Ethology and the development of modern behavioral ecology ===
Along with Tinbergen and other biologists he mentored such as Richard Dawkins, John Krebs, and Tim Clutton-Brock, Blurton-Jones contributed to the synthesis of the modern biological study of behavior from several related and preceding approaches, such as ethology. Primarily, this contribution was through his introduction of mathematical modeling of natural selection in studies of human behavior, development, and reproduction, which have since become standard in such research. This realm was a major interest of Tinbergen's, which he described and partially predicted in 1963:

... the thesis that we are witnessing [is] the fusing of many sciences, all concerned with one or another aspect of behaviour into one coherent science, for which the only correct name is ‘Biology of Behaviour'

— Tinbergen, On aims and methods of Ethology, p. 430

Traditionally, ethology is considered to have split into sociobiology and behavioral ecology, the former instigated by the American evolutionary biologist E. O. Wilson with his 1975 book, Sociobiology: The New Synthesis. Here, "new synthesis" refers to an ostensible successor to the modern synthesis of evolutionary biology, which fused several related scientific topics such as population genetics, natural selection, and Mendelian inheritance. Wilson's book sparked a yet-unresolved debate among scientists and in popular discourse, and from the start the term was often avoided in public forums and especially when applied to human populations. In particular, accusations of biological essentialism and scientific racism were levied against Wilson by groups such as Science for the People. Behavioral ecology (and by extension human behavioral ecology) became the generally preferred terms, and today represent the majority self-identification of researchers in this realm. Blurton-Jones generally referred to his approaches as behavioral or social ecology, bringing human cultural traits into the scope of analysis as ecological effects in human evolution and paleoanthropology.

Tinbergen discussed the topic further in the foreward to Blurton-Jones' scientific reference text, Ethological Studies of Child Behavior (1972):

As I was reading the variety of studies on which the book reports (many of which I had until recently been following only from a distance), I was increasingly reminded of the early days of animal ethology, and I felt that what is now just beginning to happen in human ethology is reminiscent of what occurred in the later 'twenties and early 'thirties to the science of animal behaviour; a new type of research worker is busy building the foundations of a science, by returning, with renewed attention and interest in detail, to the basic task of observation and description of the natural phenomena that have to be understood. I call this 'building' because, with due respect to human psychology in its widest sense, I consider that it is not yet really a science.

In January 1977, Blurton-Jones chaired an important symposium for the Society for the Study of Human Biology at St. Antony's College, Oxford, along with the British anthropologist Vernon Reynolds. It was the Society's first meeting on the topic of human behavior in an evolutionary context, and was funded by the Nuffield Foundation and the Royal Society which allowed for a large number of presentations from leading biologists, zoologists, and psychologists at the time, including William H. Durham, Andrew P. Vayda, Bonnie McCay, David J. McFarland, Roy Rappaport, Craig Packer, David R. Harris, Töres Theorell, Mary Carruthers, and Gunnar Johansson. The authors presented various positions on their own clinical and ethnographic research, as well as discussions of the developing nature and methods of behavioral ecology at the time. Blurton-Jones published the proceedings the following year in a volume entitled Human Behavior and Adaptation.

Since the 1970s, various related subdisciplines specific to human behavior have arisen and interacted in various ways, such as gene-culture coevolution (also known as "dual-inheritance theory" or DIT), cultural evolution, and evolutionary psychology. The latter has faced the most criticism, especially accusations of "just-so stories" and a pervasive lack of empirical rigor by figures such as David Sloan Wilson. In 1990, Blurton-Jones reviewed some of the competing approaches and, like Sloan Wilson, offered a critique of evolutionary psychology (then referred to as "Darwinian psychology") as lacking an empirical basis for investigation:

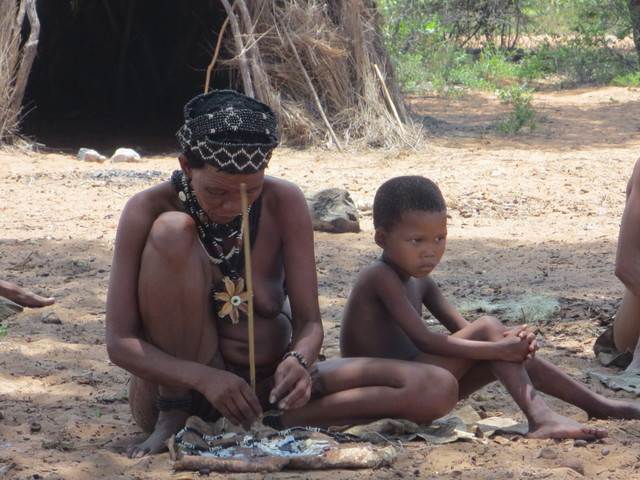
Cultural learning is vital to human survival, and older individuals play an important role in this process across all cultures.

the biggest challenge to Darwinian psychologists is certainly not establishing their claim to a logically meaningful place in our field (they have one) but showing us what they are going to do, and how, and just doing it.

— Blurton-Jones, Three sensible paradigms for research on evolution and human behavior?

=== Grandmother hypothesis ===
The grandmother hypothesis is a conjecture which relates the relatively dramatic post-reproductive lifespan of humans to increased survival of children (especially infants) as well as the transmission of cultural learning. In this way, it is considered a subtype of cooperative breeding possibly unique to humans, and is one of the most important theoretical problems in the study of human life history evolution. While unique to humans in proportion of total lifespan, both menopause and significant post-menopausal lifespan have been documented in social mammals including chimpanzees, and has independently evolved at least four times in toothed whales.

Alongside decades of collaboration with Hawkes and O'Connell, Blurton-Jones contributed to the field ethnography and the development and mathematical formalizing of the grandmother hypothesis, introducing evolutionary concepts such as kin selection and inclusive fitness to parameterize the broad but largely unstructured idea. The trio also produced a very large corpus on data on the life histories of modern foragers with which to test these analytical approaches, and published considerations for the cautious use of data on modern foragers as a comparative basis in paleoanthropology, including on female post-reproductive life.
