= Clouding of consciousness =

Impairment in the clarity of consciousness

Clouding of consciousness, also called brain fog or mental fog, occurs when a person is conscious but slightly less wakeful or aware than normal. The term "brain fog" is used to represent a subjective condition of perceived cognitive impairment. A 2023 review article defined brain fog as "a phenomenon of fluctuating states of perceived cognitive dysfunction that could have implications in the functional application of cognitive skills in people's participation in daily activities". Sufferers may be less aware of time and their surroundings, and find it difficult to pay attention. People describe this subjective sensation as their mind being "foggy".

== Background ==
Clouding of consciousness denotes a less severe state of cognitive impairment than outright delirium. As more abject alteration of consciousness is recognized, physicians may describe patients as in a "confusional state" or delirious, "obtunded", "stuporous", or, in the severest cases, "comatose".

=== Feature of delirium ===
The term clouding of consciousness has always denoted the main pathogenetic feature of delirium since physician Georg Greiner pioneered the term (Verdunkelung des Bewusstseins) in 1817. The Diagnostic and Statistical Manual of Mental Disorders (DSM) has historically used the term in its definition of delirium. The DSM-III-R and the DSM-IV replaced "clouding of consciousness" with "disturbance of consciousness" to make it easier to operationalize, but it is still fundamentally the same thing. Clouding of consciousness may be less severe than delirium on a spectrum of abnormal consciousness. Clouding of consciousness may be synonymous with subsyndromal delirium.

Subsyndromal delirium differs from normal delirium by being overall less severe, lacking acuteness in onset and duration, having a relatively stable sleep-wake cycle, and having relatively stable motor alterations. Subsyndromal delirium's significant clinical features are inattention, thought process abnormalities, comprehension abnormalities, and language abnormalities. Delirium's full clinical manifestations may never be reached. Among intensive care unit patients, subsyndromal subjects were as likely to survive as patients with a Delirium Screening Checklist score of 0, but required extended care at rates greater than 0-scoring patients (although lower rates than those with full ICU delirium) and had a decreased post-discharge level of functional independence compared to the general population.

In clinical practice, no standard test is exclusive and specific; therefore, diagnosis depends on the physician's subjective impression. The DSM-IV-TR instructs clinicians to code subsyndromal delirium presentations under the miscellaneous category "cognitive disorder not otherwise specified".

== Psychopathology ==
The cerebral cortex and the hippocampus are known to play a critical role in the presentation of brain fog in specific settings. The cerebral cortex, the brain's outermost layer, attached to the cerebrum, is responsible for more advanced processes, such as thought, information recall, maintained wakefulness, and consciousness. The hippocampus, deep within the brain's temporal lobe, organizes, stores, and retrieves information within it, converting memory from short-term to long. It plays a crucial role in enhancing spatial and verbal memory. The cerebral cortex and hippocampus work together to organize and add timing to multiple unconscious brain processes, turning them into a continuous and coherent flow of conscious experience.

Disrupting circadian regulation interferes with neural activation and hippocampus memory processing, reducing thought clarity and alertness and causing confusion. Dysfunction in the hippocampus may limit awareness and make forming cohesive thoughts difficult, resulting in cognitive lapses. These irregularities collectively cause what is known as "brain fog" or clouded consciousness.

The prefrontal cortex (PFC), in the anterior part of the frontal lobe, helps to regulate thought, feeling, and objective-based behavior. It is the final brain region that undergoes myelination, a mechanism by which insulating myelin sheaths form surrounding axons to improve the rapidity and efficacy of communication between neurons via brain networks.

Research has found that higher cognitive function requires coordinated interaction between the PFC and posterior cortical regions. These posterior areas provide the sensory and perceptual content of conscious experience, whereas the PFC facilitates the executive processes that organize, regulate, and keep that content in awareness. The specific aspects of consciousness correspond to precise patterns of activation within posterior cortical regions, while the PFC helps structure and integrate those activations into coherent thought.

=== Wake–sleep regulation and neuronal disinhibition ===
Consciousness was historically believed to be a product of the whole of activity in the cerebral hemispheres. But the conscious state is not altered by injury to one hemisphere, "except if the size of [a brain lesion] affects other cortical areas or the diencephalon" or if the lesion is exceptionally large. 1916 research by Romanian-Viennese neurologist Constantin von Economo found that specific regions of the brain (the midbrain and diencephalon) targeted by encephalitis lethargica (sleeping sickness) produced alterations in wake-sleep regulation. He identified a site at the junction of the brainstem and forebrain where lesions produced prolonged sleepiness, as well as a site that included the anterior hypothalamus where, conversely, lesions produced prolonged insomnia. Based on his observation of patients experiencing lethargy who all had lesions at the junction between these two regions (an area that included the posterior lateral hypothalamus), Von Economo proposed "an ascending arousal system originating in the brainstem that kept the forebrain awake", suggesting that narcolepsy was caused by its dysfunction. This supports the modern notion that distinct segments of the central nervous system are critical for consciousness.

The conceptual model of clouding of consciousness in psychopathology is that of a part of the brain regulating the "overall level" of consciousness, which is responsible for awareness of oneself and of the environment. Various etiologies disturb this regulating part of the brain, which in turn disturbs the "overall level" of consciousness. This system of a sort of general activation of consciousness is called "arousal" or "wakefulness".

=== Altered cognition ===
Clouding of consciousness is not necessarily accompanied by drowsiness. Patients may not be sleepy yet still have clouded consciousness (disorder of wakefulness). Paradoxically, affected individuals say they are "awake but, in another way, not". Lipowski points out that decreased "wakefulness" as used here is not exactly synonymous with drowsiness. One is a stage on the way to coma, the other on the way to sleep, which is very different.

The affected person has a sensation of mental clouding described in the patient's own words as "foggy". One patient said, "I thought it became like misty, in some way... the outlines were sort of fuzzy". Others may describe a "spaced-out" feeling. Affected people compare their overall experience to that of a dream, because, as in a dream, consciousness, attention, orientation to time and place, perception, and awareness are disturbed. Barbara Schildkrout, a clinical instructor in psychiatry at the Harvard Medical School, described her subjective experience of clouding of consciousness, which she also called "mental fog", after taking a single dose of chlorpheniramine (an antihistamine for her allergy to cottonwood) on a cross-country road trip. She described feeling "out of it" and being in a "dreamy state". She described a sense of not trusting her own judgment and a dulled awareness, not knowing how much time had passed. Clouding of consciousness is not the same thing as depersonalization, though people affected by both compare their experience to that of a dream. Psychometric tests produce little evidence of a relationship between clouding of consciousness and depersonalization.

Brain fog may affect performance on virtually any cognitive task. As one author put it, "It should be apparent that cognition is not possible without a reasonable degree of arousal." Cognition includes perception, memory, learning, executive functions, language, constructive abilities, voluntary motor control, attention, and mental speed. Brain fog's most significant clinical features are inattention, thought process abnormalities, comprehension abnormalities, and language abnormalities. The extent of the impairment is variable because inattention may impair several cognitive functions. Affected people may complain of forgetfulness, being "confused", or being "unable to think straight". Despite the similarities, subsyndromal delirium is not the same thing as mild cognitive impairment; the fundamental difference is that mild cognitive impairment is a dementia-like impairment, which does not involve a disturbance in arousal (wakefulness).

== Drug use and withdrawal ==
Use of and withdrawal from certain recreational and prescription drugs has been shown to alter brain cognition and contribute to memory loss, impaired recall, emotional volatility, mood instability, and altered behavior. It can also heighten stress, dysregulate pleasure and the basal ganglia's reward system, and limit executive control function by disrupting normal function of the prefrontal cortex, leading to difficulty concentrating, "organiz[ing] thoughts and activities, prioritiz[ing] tasks, manag[ing] time, and mak[ing] decisions".

People may misuse substances as a means of self-medication for psychological/neuro-cognitive difficulties, masking symptoms during use periods but leading to a rebound or exacerbation of symptoms in the immediate post-abstinence period. This may result from the users' dependency on and subsequent restriction from the substance in question, or from neurocognitive impairment / neurodegeneration resulting from use.

=== Dopamine dysregulation ===
As addictive behaviors persist, dopamine is depleted at a faster pace, and its receptors increasingly dulled by oversaturation, leading to a reduced sensitivity to dopamine produced naturally by the body over time. It has been consistently shown that addicts present with both lower responsiveness to dopamine, particularly in D2 receptors, and lower dopamine production overall. This, in turn, dysregulates the brain's natural reward mechanisms, leading to decreased motivation, anxiety, difficulty thinking and concentrating, impulsivity, fatigue, emotional blunting, short-term memory disruptions, forgetfulness, disorganization, loss of coordination and balance, and social withdrawal.

This self-reinforcing process is often reversed with restriction from the substance in question. Initial acute impacts are pronounced, but dopamine levels begin to stabilize during the withdrawal period, albeit slowly, and eventually return to a healthy baseline.

=== By substance ===
==== Alcohol ====
Heavy, progressive, and persistent alcohol abuse (alcohol use disorder (AUD)) lasting more than several years has been shown to lead to brain damage. Cognitive difficulties related to alcohol use that do not progress into more severe illness are called alcohol-related brain damage (ARBD). Symptoms include mild executive dysfunction as well as deficits in memory, coordination, motor control, and visuospatial skills. Cognitive deficits differ significantly between patients, suggesting "that the functions affected by chronic alcohol consumption are dissociable and supported by different neural systems".

===== Wernicke-Korsakoff Syndrome =====
Persistent alcohol use disorder lasting several years or more can contribute to severe malnutrition. Alcohol abuse hinders the gut's ability to properly absorb critical nutrients, and the brain's ability to phosphorylate them. Chief among these deficiencies is thiamine (Vitamin B-1). With an incidence rate as high as 12.5% in patients with alcoholism, such a deficiency can lead to Wernicke encephalopathy (WE), though this is reversible through rapid therapeutic treatment with thiamine and glucose. This stage is characterized by confusion (of a more severe degree than brain fog), incoherence, motor impairments, loss of coordination and balance, and impairments in the visual domain. The mortality rate for patients at this stage is around 20%. Roughly 12% of patients experience disease improvement, with chronic brain damage potentially being avoided with treatment, though not all cognitive effects are reversible.

WE, if left untreated, can progress to Korsakoff syndrome (as is the case in roughly 68-80% of cases), an irreversible form of chronic amnesia. This stage is characterized by relief from severe confusion, less incoherence, and clear consciousness over the course of the day, but, in the longer term, severe anterograde memory impairments (both memory formation (anterograde amnesia) and recall), confabulation, hallucination, repetitive speech and action, severe executive dysfunction, lack of motivation, and emotional apathy. Additionally, patients may experience symptoms more reminiscent of brain fog, including "deficits on tests of problem solving, working memory, cognitive flexibility, perseverative responding, and self-regulation." Memory rehabilitation therapy may help to relieve symptoms; severe cases often require institutionalization.

==== Cannabis ====
The effects of cannabis on neurological function have become better known in recent years, with the overwhelming majority of research finding that cannabis impairs cognitive function. The duration and frequency of use and quantity and concentration of product consumed correlates with the degree and duration of impairment. The immediate short-term effects of cannabis use can include "impaired short-term memory and motor coordination, altered judgment, paranoia, and psychosis". Long-term use can lead to "altered brain development, poor educational outcomes, cognitive impairment, diminished quality of life", and increased risk of suicide.

The rapid increase in the THC concentration of cannabis products in recent years has led to concern among physicians that it may contribute to adverse health effects among the general population, particularly adolescents and young adults.

===== Cannabis use disorder =====
A 40-year-long study in New Zealand followed roughly 1,000 people from age 3 to 45 to measure the impacts of cannabis usage on brain function and functional IQ. It found that long-term cannabis users (those who reported consistent or dependent usage of the drug at age 45 and at least one previous period of sustained heavy usage) (Note: Weekly or more (as reported at ages 18, 21, 26, 32, 38, and 45)) experienced a mean 5.5-point drop in IQ from childhood to adulthood. These cognitive deficits "could not be explained by persistent tobacco, alcohol, or other illicit drug use, childhood socioeconomic status, low childhood self-control, or family history of substance dependence." Comparative groups fared significantly better; non-users of all substances were the only group to experience a positive change in IQ over the length of the study. Cannabis quitters (those with at least one previous instance of diagnosed cannabis dependency who reported no usage at the conclusion of the study) and recreational midlife users (those reporting use between 6 and 51 days per year in their 30s and 40s, with no history of weekly or dependent usage) experienced a smaller but nevertheless comparatively significant drop in IQ. Long-term users were the only group whose performance worsened on every cognitive benchmark assessment administered at the end of the study period.

===== Presentation in psychotic disorders =====
Numerous studies have shown that heavy cannabis users face a markedly higher risk of schizophrenia, bipolar disorder, and transient psychotic episodes than the general population, with up to 50% of those who experienced cannabis-induced psychosis going on to develop schizophrenia. But a 2010 meta-analysis of previous research in the Schizophrenia Bulletin showed evidence that those same people have a paradoxically lower risk of neurocognitive difficulties; use of the substance substantially increased the prevalence of positive symptoms, but was simultaneously associated with reduced neurocognitive deficits or, in some cases, boosted cognitive performance (e.g., visual memory, working memory, and executive function).

===== Heart health and cerebrovascular deficits =====
Studies published over the past decade have shown that cannabis use (particularly in cases of heavy use or dosage) is associated with significantly increased risk of cardiovascular deficits and/or coronary events in people under age 50, particularly ischemic strokes and myocardial infarctions (heart attacks). This effect is especially pronounced in young children. Despite having an immediate short-term impact of lowering blood pressure, cannabis has been associated with hypertension in regular and heavy users. This, in turn, can restrict the flow of oxygen to the brain, leading to "forgetfulness, trouble with learning, memory and comprehension". Continued restriction can lead to cerebral small and large vessel disease later in life, which significantly increases the likelihood of dementia onset.

== Disease and health complications ==
=== Attention deficit hyperactivity disorder (ADHD) ===
Brain fog has been shown to be a primary symptom of ADHD, though it can also be due to associated co-morbidities. In adults, ADHD typically presents as difficulties with memory and attention, as opposed to the hyperactivity typically observed in children.

=== Cancer and chemotherapy ===
Patients undergoing chemotherapy often present with brain fog (often called "chemo brain", "chemo fog", or chemotherapy-induced cognitive impairment (CICI)), a complication of the all-encompassing damage done to the brain and body over the course of treatment. Patients often report experiencing fatigue and difficulty with memory, language use, visuo-spatial skills, immediate and delayed recall, processing speed, and executive function. Such difficulties can surface both during and after treatment, with cognitive deficits being reported as much as 21 years after treatment. But some studies have found that neuro-cognitive deficits were present in some patients before beginning treatment. Hypotheses for the cause of these symptoms include "direct neurotoxicity, [blood–brain barrier] disruption, decreased hippocampal neurogenesis, white matter abnormalities, secondary neuro-inflammatory response and increased oxidative stress".

Symptoms can be exacerbated by additional side effects of treatment, including sleep cycle impairment, dietary issues, fatigue, and imbalanced mood. Though therapeutic treatments are not yet widely available, common recommendations for accelerating neuro-regeneration include regular physical exercise, proper sleep and nutrition, stress reduction, and engagement in pleasurable activity.

==== Criticism and counterarguments ====
Research published in 2017 in Neuroscience & Biobehavioral Reviews criticized the results of earlier meta-analyses and studies for their inconsistent assessment and control methods and for being broadly cross-sectional: there was no real means by which age, cancer severity, or prior treatment could be accounted for in determining the degree to which the effects of chemotherapy on cognitive function were real. That same meta-analysis found no significant difference in magnitude between the reported neurocognitive impairment of cancer survivors who underwent chemotherapy and those who did not. Additionally, little difference was shown between the moderating effect of time on cognitive impairment between those two groups, though statistical complications that may have affected such determination were acknowledged.

=== Chronic fatigue ===
In chronic fatigue syndrome (CFS), also known as myalgic encephalomyelitis, the CDC's recommended criteria for diagnosis include that one of the following symptoms must be present:

- Problems with thinking and memory (cognitive dysfunction, sometimes described as "brain fog")
- While standing or sitting upright, lightheadedness, dizziness, weakness, fainting, or vision changes may occur (orthostatic intolerance)

Patients diagnosed with CFS have been shown to experience reduced activation of the basal ganglia, responsible for the brain's reward system, and a primary center for inflammation therein. Treatment thus centers upon increasing dopaminergic activity/receptivity in the brain and/or preventing inflammation.

=== Chronic pain ===
Brain fog is a common symptom in many illnesses where chronic pain is a major component. Brain fog affects 15% to 40% of those with chronic pain as their major illness. In such illnesses, pain processing may use up resources, decreasing the brain's ability to think effectively.

=== Cognitive disengagement syndrome ===
Cognitive disengagement syndrome was implicated in the expression of brain fog symptoms.

=== Fibromyalgia ===
Many people with fibromyalgia experience cognitive problems (often called "fibrofog"), which may involve impaired concentration, problems with short- and long-term memory, short-term memory consolidation, working memory, impaired speed of performance, inability to multitask, cognitive overload, and diminished attention span. About 75% of fibromyalgia patients report significant problems with concentration, memory, and multitasking. A 2018 meta-analysis found that the largest differences between fibromyalgia patients and healthy subjects were in inhibitory control, memory, and processing speed. Many of these are also common symptoms of ADHD, and studies have linked the two conditions, to the point that a fibromyalgia diagnosis has been proposed as an indication to screen for ADHD. It is alternatively hypothesized that increased pain compromises attention systems, resulting in cognitive problems.

=== Hypothyroidism ===
Brain fog and additional neuro-cognitive difficulties are a common symptom of hypothyroidism. Symptoms often include "fatigue, depressed mood, and cognitive difficulties, including problems with memory and word-finding". In some cases, this may result from insufficient treatment of thyroid deficiencies, or additional, untreated co-morbidities, such as "depression, sleep apnea, or vitamin B12 deficiency". A 2022 survey showed that 79.2% of those with the condition reported experiencing brain fog to some extent, selecting the options "frequently" or "all the time". One American Thyroid Association study found that among a cohort of 5,000 patients presenting with hypothyroidism, more than 95% of those experiencing brain fog (a majority of study participants) reported experiencing "fatigue, forgetfulness, sleepiness and difficulty focusing".

It is unclear how hypothyroidism leads to brain fog, but levothyroxine has been shown to reduce cognitive impairment in some patients. However, roughly 10-15% of those receiving such treatment experience persistent cognitive deficits and reduced quality of life, with some believing this demonstrates persistent hypothyroidism at the cellular level despite tests showing TSH results in the normal range. This may lead patients to seek higher dosage, which doctors often dismiss, or alternative therapies, such as desiccated thyroid extract (DTE), despite the lack of evidence supporting its use. Some patients, more commonly those over age 50, reported improvement with the addition of liothyronine (L-T3) to their treatment regimen, though some researchers question its efficacy . Rest and exercise have also been shown to help alleviate symptoms.

=== Lyme disease ===
Lyme disease's neurologic syndrome, called Lyme encephalopathy, is associated with subtle memory and cognitive difficulties, among other issues. Lyme can Count, L. S., Count, L. L., Growth, H., Dandruff, H., & Foods, H. (2020). Brain fog. Brain. a chronic encephalomyelitis that resembles multiple sclerosis. It may be progressive and can involve cognitive impairment, migraines, balance problems, and other symptoms.

=== Menopause ===
Menopause, officially described as the end of menstruation and reproductive hormone production in those assigned female at birth who still possess primary female sexual characteristics, can be characterized in all stages by deficits in cognitive performance (sometimes referred to as "meno-fog"). Though symptoms vary significantly between patients depending on factors such as genetics, ethnicity, and preexisting conditions, brain fog has been shown to be exceptionally common, with up to 80% of people experiencing it at some point over the course of transition. Cognitive dysfunction is most prevalent in the perimenopausal period, particularly in the domains of informational acquisition, concentration, and memory; anecdotal evidence suggests that absent-mindedness and confusion are common in several stages. But these symptoms are often temporary, and begin to relieve as the postmenopausal period progresses.

A 2022 study published in Menopause analyzed a group of 404 women from rural India between the ages of 40 and 65, assessing the severity of their menopausal symptoms (on the Greene Climacteric Scale) and cognitive performance (scoring orientation, registration, attention, recall, and language and visuospatial skills by means of the Hindi Mini-Mental State Examination). Women with severe menopausal symptoms presented with significantly lower mean performance across all cognitive domains. The study additionally found evidence that common menopause symptoms, particularly severe depression and greater sexual dysfunction, were closely linked to cognitive difficulties, though it failed to establish a causal relationship between them, meaning there was little indication whether one preceded the other. Symptoms of "depression, total psychological, sexual, and somatic dysfunction" were most severe for late postmenopausal women (those whose periods had ceased more than 5 years before the time of the study); anxiety and hot flashes were found to be most common among those in early postmenopause (whose periods had ceased less than 5 years earlier). The study found no relationship between the severity of vasomotor symptoms (hot flashes) and cognitive performance.

Cognitive deficits are believed to result in part from the sudden drop in estrogen across "virtually every organ", contributing in turn to hormonal imbalances that disrupt the brain's and body's natural processes. It is believed that estrogen plays a crucial role for people of all genders in the function of the prefrontal cortex, the proper functioning of which is critical to executive processes such as "inhibiting distracting information and stimuli, planning, evaluating consequences when making decisions, and working memory." The transition affects serotonergic and dopaminergic expression, contributing to imbalances in cognition and mood. Additionally, elevated stress and a subsequent increase in cortisol may contribute to memory and processing difficulties.

Prescriptions depend upon determination of the cause of cognitive dysfunction. Reducing stress, challenging oneself intellectually, maintaining proper fitness and nutrition, adequate hydration, sleep (known to be particularly dysfunctional amid menopause), sun exposure, and social support are generally known to assist in improving cognition. Hormone replacement therapy is thought to help relieve cognitive and broader symptoms in some patients.

=== Mold exposure ===
Brain fog and other neurological symptoms may also result from mold exposure. This may be due to mycotoxin exposure and consequent innate immune system activation and inflammation, including in the central nervous system. But adverse neurological health effects of mold exposure are controversial due to inadequate research and data, and more research is needed in this area.

== See also ==
- Altered level of consciousness
- Brain fag syndrome
- Cannabis use disorder
- Cognitive impairment
- Cognitive orthotics
- Dementia
- Depersonalization-derealization disorder
- Excessive daytime sleepiness
- Four boxes test
- Idiopathic hypersomnia
- Insomnia
- Mental confusion
- Mild cognitive impairment
- Neurodegenerative disease
- Obtundation
- Postural orthostatic tachycardia syndrome (POTS)
- Post-chemotherapy cognitive impairment
- Pumphead syndrome
- Reactive hypoglycemia
- Sleep inertia
- Slow-wave sleep
- Somnolence
- Stupor
