= Canadian College of Naturopathic Medicine =

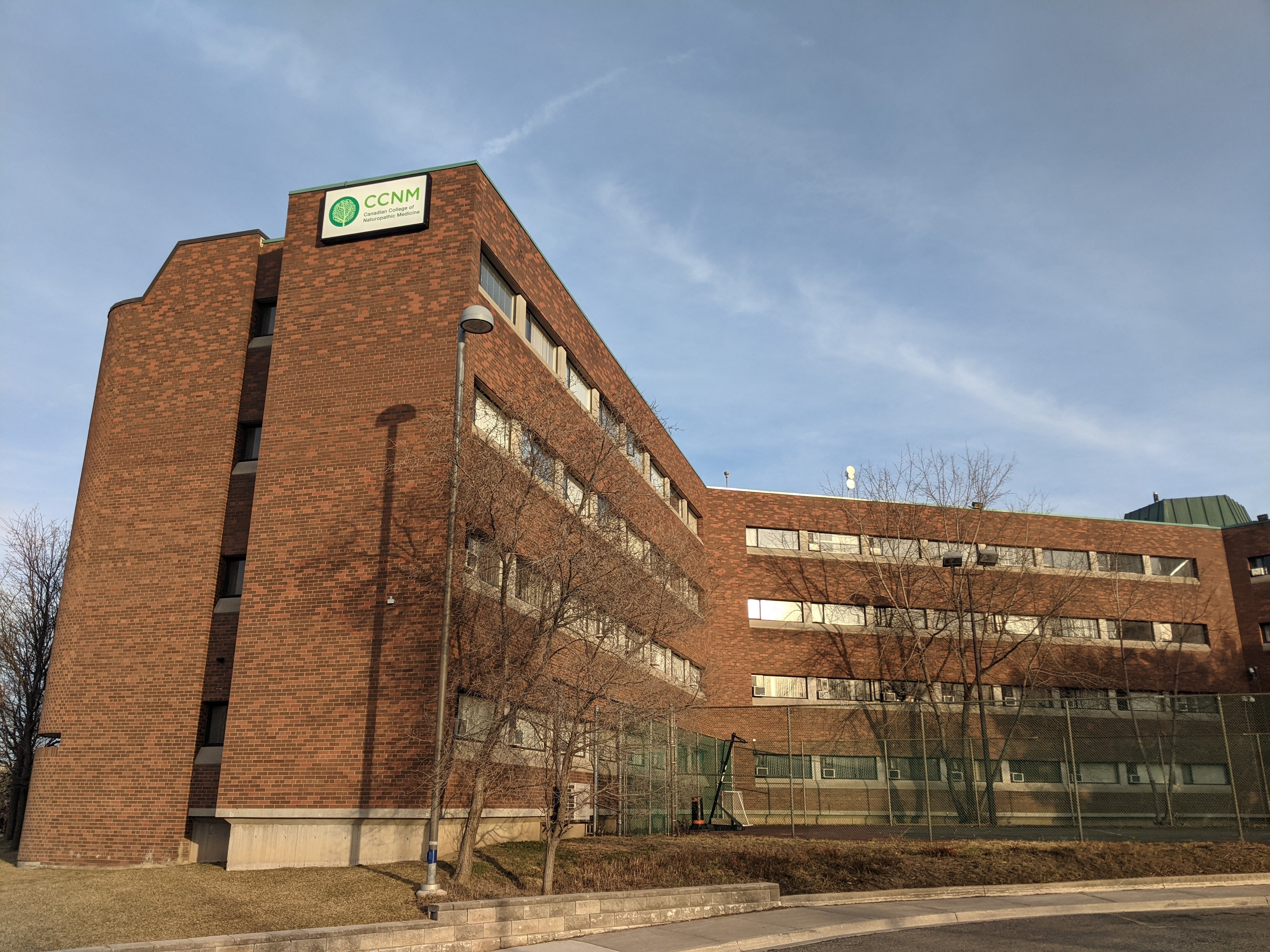
- CCNM Leslie campus
- Other names: Institute of Naturopathic Education and Research (INER)
- Type: Professional school
- Established: 1978
- Affiliations: AANMC, CNME, NABNE
- President: Dr. Rahim Karim
- Dean: Nick DeGroot
- Academic staff: 90
- Administrative staff: 100
- Students: 550
- Location: Toronto and New Westminster, Ontario and British Columbia, Canada
- Campus: Urban
- Website: ccnm.edu
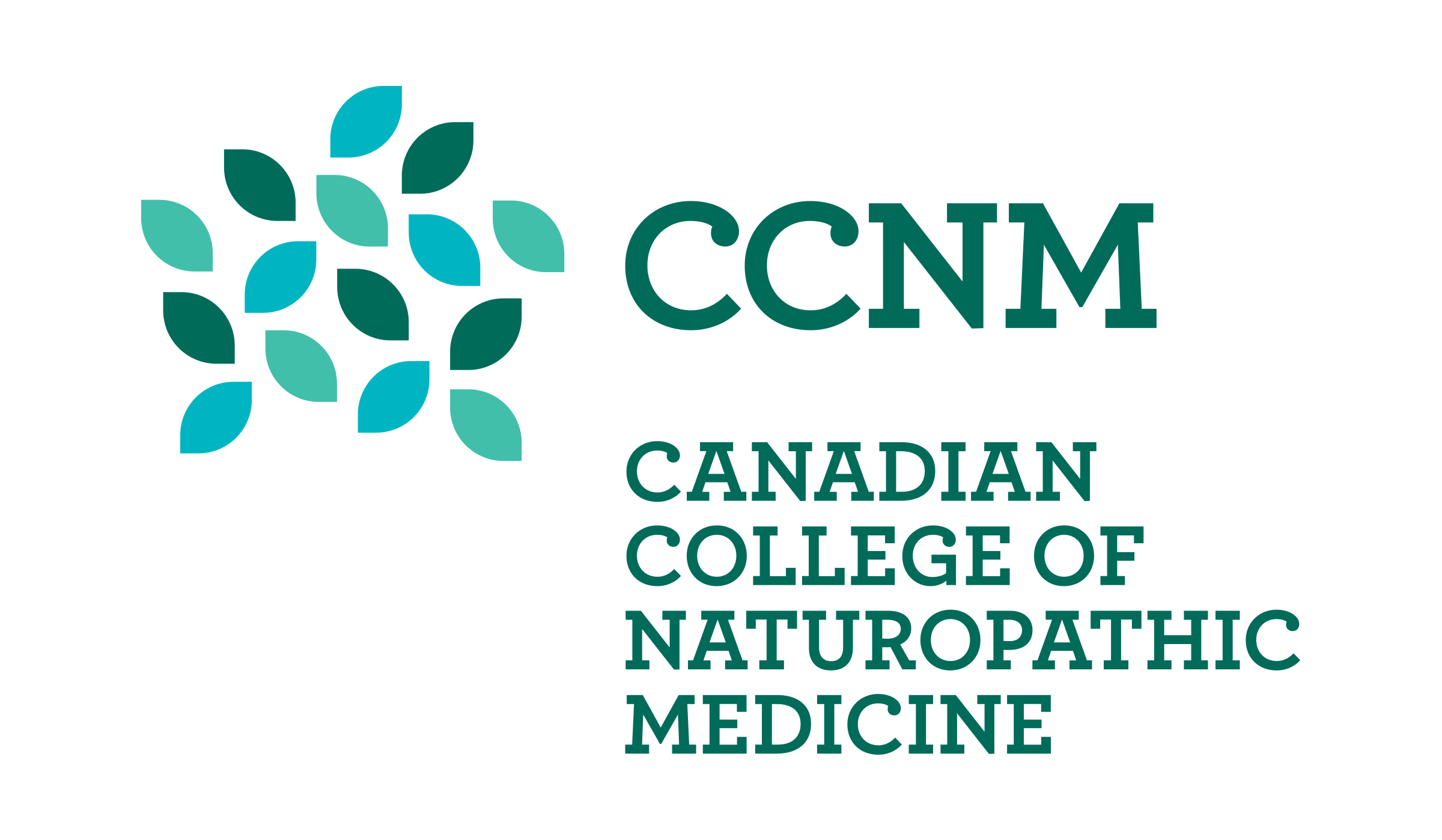

The Canadian College of Naturopathic Medicine (CCNM) is a private, not-for-profit institution with two campus locations: the CCNM -Toronto Campus in Toronto, Ontario, Canada, and the CCNM -Boucher Campus in New Westminster, British Columbia, Canada.

The college's legal operating name is the Institute of Naturopathic Education and Research. CCNM offers a degree program in naturopathic medicine, a form of alternative medicine that has been criticized by scientists as pseudoscientific. Graduates are eligible to take licensing examinations to become naturopaths in several jurisdictions.

== History ==
CCNM was established in Toronto as the Ontario College of Naturopathic Medicine (OCNM) in 1978 by naturopaths Robert B. Farquharson, Gregory "Asa" Hershoff, John G. LaPlante, William Morris, Eric Shrubb, and Gordon Smith. OCNM originally offered a post-graduate program to doctors from other health professions, such as medical doctors and chiropractors. The school moved to its first permanent building in Kitchener, Ontario in 1981. OCNM incorporated as the non-profit, charitable Institute of Naturopathic Education and Research in 1983, the year before it moved from its Kitchener location back to downtown Toronto. The school relocated again in 1986 to accommodate larger class sizes. The school adopted its present name in 1992 and relocated again in 1996, before finally moving to its current location in North York in 1999. In 2013, CCNM opened the Brampton Naturopathic Teaching Clinic (BNTC), the first naturopathic clinic within a Canadian hospital, in collaboration with the William Osler Health System and Central West Local Health Integration Network.

CCNM is currently accredited by the Council on Naturopathic Medical Education (CNME) until 2029. In May 2014, the Minister of Training, Colleges and Universities awarded the college degree-granting status, after review by the Post–Secondary Education Quality-Assessment Board (PEQAB).

== Academics and objectives ==
The college currently offers a four-year, professional Doctor of Naturopathy degree.

The curriculum integrates clinical practice (ex. patient communication, healthcare collaboration) and naturopathic disease prevention, diagnosis, and treatment.

=== Standard program and curriculum ===
The three major areas of study are biomedical sciences, clinical sciences, and naturopathic therapeutics.

The biomedical sciences segment of the curriculum (years 1 and 2) involves the study of anatomy (gross anatomy and prosection), embryology, clinical physiology, biochemistry, microbiology, immunology, public health, pharmacology, clinical pathology and laboratory diagnostics. Introductory courses in the naturopathic modalities include botanical medicine, homeopathy, nutrition, Asian medicine and acupuncture, physical medicine, and psychology. It is recommended that students also take step-one of the Naturopathic Physicians Licensing Examinations (NPLEX) prior to commencing third year.

Prior to commencing fourth year (clinical internship), students are required to pass a clinic-entry exam (i.e. OSCE-III). Clinical rotations take place at the Robert Schad Naturopathic Teaching Clinic (RSNC), BNTC, and several community health clinics (e.g. Sherbourne Health Centre).

=== Bridge delivery program for IMGs ===
Bridge delivery for International Medical Graduates (IMGs) of the naturopathic medicine program was established in 2012 and its first class began in 2013. The delivery is a two-year fast track for IMGs who wish to become naturopathic doctors without having to re-take courses or write challenge exams for advanced standing for courses in which they are expected to have expertise, such as physiology and anatomy.

IMGs are required to have achieved a passing grade on either the Medical Council of Canada Evaluating Examination (MCCEE) or the United States Medical licensing Examination Step I (USMLE I) in addition to have graduated from a medical school recognized by the Medical Council of Canada. Bridge delivery is not considered a discrete program; its graduates are expected to have the same competencies as their full-time-student peers and will be awarded the same degree and designation upon successful completion of the program.

== Attached Clinics ==
=== Robert Schad Naturopathic Clinic ===
Located at the Leslie campus, the RSNC logs upwards of 26,000 patient visits each year. It is one of several teaching clinics where licensed NDs work train fourth-year interns. The clinic features a botanical compounding room, a hydrotherapy suite, private consultation rooms, conference rooms and a laboratory for in-house testing. The clinic also offers free and low-cost naturopathic care at five teaching satellite clinics around the Greater Toronto Area.

=== Brampton Civic Hospital Naturopathic Teaching Clinic ===
The CCNM, in partnership with the William Osler Health System and Local Health Integration Network, opened the Brampton Naturopathic Teaching Clinic (BNTC) in 2013 at the Brampton Civic Hospital as a pilot project. The BNTC is the first naturopathic clinic in a hospital in Canada. The clinic was opened in support and as a component of Osler's "philosophy to help ensure greater access to community care options.", and its steering committee includes representatives from both CCNM and the Brampton Civic Hospital. Similarly to the RSNC, licensed NDs train fourth year interns at this location. Services are entirely free to the public.

== Criticism ==
CCNM teaches naturopathic medicine, a form of alternative medicine, rather than evidence-based medicine. Naturopathic medicine is considered pseudoscience.

== Notable alumni ==
- Lara Briden
