= Jerilynn Prior =

Canadian endocrinologist

Jerilynn C. Prior
- Born: Alaska, United States
- Citizenship: United States (by birthplace), Canada (naturalized)
- Occupations: Endocrinologist, medical doctor, professor
- Employer: University of British Columbia

Jerilynn C. Prior is a Canadian endocrinologist and medical doctor specializing in menstrual cycles and the effects of hormones on women's health. She has been called a leader in understanding and treating perimenopause and menopause. She was born in the United States and moved to Canada in 1976, and has taken citizenship there.

== Biography ==
Jerilynn Prior grew up in small Indigenous fishing village in Alaska. Prior was inspired to work in medicine after a public nurse visited her school to administer vaccinations.

Prior was granted a scholarship from the National Science Foundation for her to study English literature at Linfield College, Oregon. Prior then proceeded to study at the University of Oregon School of Medicine. However, continuing into her third year of studies, Prior transferred to Boston University School of Medicine. Prior graduated with honors, completing her master's degree in medicine in 1969. Prior received her first training placement at Internal Medicine in Boston. Prior became a physician and worked in various states across the USA.

Prior moved to Canada in 1976 because she believed in the universal healthcare system. Prior says that her research would have been very limited had she stayed in America. Prior became a Canadian citizen in 1984 and currently lives in Vancouver, British Columbia. Prior has been retired from clinical practice since 2009, after spending 40 years helping patients. Prior still partakes in consultations with health care practitioners in Canada and has been a professor at the University of British Columbia since 1994. Prior still works full time by doing research, writing and teaching.

Starting in 1967, Prior engaged in tax resistance to protest government spending on war, and she continued this protest after her move to Canada, refusing to pay a portion of her federal income tax equivalent to the war-related portion of the federal budget. When the government pursued the withheld money, Prior contested this in court. The Tax Court rejected her case, which she then appealed on freedom of conscience / freedom of religion grounds to the Federal Court of Appeal, which turned her down in 1988. The Supreme Court declined to hear her appeal in 1990, and a further appeal to the UN Human Rights Committee also met with no success. She wrote a book about her struggle: I Feel the Winds of God Today.

== Scientific work ==
Prior has proved to be a leader in the scientific community, especially regarding the use of progesterone; in fact, unlike many of her colleagues, Prior has been prescribing progesterone for postmenopausal women and perimenopausal women to treat hot flashes, night sweats, heavy flow, and sore breasts since 1995. In a 2014 study conducted by Dr. Prior and colleagues, it was proven that progesterone is an effective treatment for menopausal hot flashes and night sweats. These findings debunk the beliefs that progesterone causes serious health concerns, including cardiovascular disease, and shows how the negative effects of progesterone have been "overblown". Within the international scientific community, Prior is especially known for her studies that prove progesterone causes women's increased bone formation.

Prior has also conducted extensive research regarding combined hormonal contraceptive, more commonly known as 'the pill'. Specifically, Prior has found evidence suggesting that using the pill early on can impact reproductive health. In her review of the long-term effects for younger patients using the pill, Prior found that women who had been on the pill had lower ovarian reserve and also took longer to conceive a first child. By focusing her research on adolescents, Prior is contributing to a field of research that has been mostly focused on older women.

Additionally, Prior has often and openly voiced hesitation for dispensing birth control for reasons "it was never designed for". According to Prior, most young women taking the pill are not given a prescription for birth control, but for an array of other reasons including cramping, acne, heavy periods, and irregular cycles. However, Prior argues that it takes years for a regular ovulation to take place, that "our bodies need time to find their natural cycle" and that other prescriptions or medicine are better suited. For example, taking ibuprofen for alleviate the pain of cramps is a much better solution, given that it also lessens heavy flow. For adolescents, Prior recommends either a progestin-releasing IUD or a "combination of diaphragm and spermicidal gel", which are safer alternatives to the pill and more effective given that teens are not as diligent as older women when taking the pill.

== Academic/career accomplishments ==
Prior is Professor of Endocrinology and Metabolism at the University of British Columbia, founder and scientific director of the Centre for Menstrual Cycle and Ovulation Research (CeMCOR), director of the BC Center of the Canadian Multicenter Osteoporosis Study (CaMOS), and a past president of the Society for Menstrual Cycle Research.

Prior is the author of three books, has over 200 publications, and holds 6 patents. She was awarded the University of British Columbia Faculty of Medicine Distinguished Medical Research Lecturer Award in 2002. Her research-based novel Estrogen's Storm Season was a finalist in the 2006 Independent Publishers Book Awards for Health. She co-wrote the perimenopause chapter for the 40th anniversary edition of Our Bodies, Ourselves.

Susan Love has called Prior a "champion for women's health", and she has been credited as one of the first researchers to propose that psychological and sociocultural factors must be considered in medical research on women's health. Prior has been critical of the "medicalization of all things female" and has been recognized for pioneering research into women's ranges of normal experiences and physiology.

== Contributions to feminism ==
When Prior first began her career in medicine, she was one of the very few women in the field. Through all of Prior's scientific contributions and her valued reputation, she has created an environment where people are "less quick to judge someone negatively just because she is a woman.". Prior has opened up new doors to research which will further benefit and educate women all around the world Prior has achieved remarkable advancements as a feminist, specifically when it comes to the advancement of research on endocrinological health. Feminist approaches have seldom included women reaching the menopausal stages in life. Prior has extended the common feminist notion and pushed for inclusion of aging and senior women in movements and research.

Prior has highlighted that women were originally seen as being biologically inferior. Through Prior's scientific work, she has argued that women should be deemed equal in value to men, without cultural prejudice. Prior's main premise through her research is "women should have safe, appropriate treatments and the means to understand their own bodies" the same way men do. Prior has taken a stance in defence of discrimination when it comes to scientific research. Women have been left out of scientific studies as a result of physiological variabilities in terms of menstruation. Prior responded to the notion by saying that in science comparing men to women is like "comparing apples to oranges." In other words, men cannot adequately replace women in research because of physiological differences. As a result of scientific exclusion, women currently do not have accurate information about specific interventions. Prior says that women are more likely to have an adverse reaction to medicine, which makes it very significant for women to be heavily involved in research. By advocating for the inclusion of women in scientific research, Prior is contributing to feminism.

== Description of books ==
- Estrogen's Storm Season: Stories of Perimenopause
  - Prior provides perimenopausal women and healthcare professionals with necessary tools to cope at this stage of life.
- Transitions Through the Perimenopausal Years: Demystifying Your Journey
  - The female journey of perimenopause is discussed. Complex scientific information is simplified making it easier for women to understand.
- The Estrogen Errors: Why Progesterone is Better for Women's Health
  - The belief that estrogen therapy is the most optimal is challenged in this book. Scientific and personal experience is incorporated to debunk false beliefs.
