= Briden =

Briden is a surname. Notable people with the surname include:

- Briden (Middlesex cricketer) (fl. 1826), given name not known
- Briden (Surrey cricketer) (fl. 1798), given name not known
- Archie Briden (1897–1974), Canadian hockey player
- Lara Briden (born 1969), Canadian author, doctor, and health speaker
