= DSST =

DSST may refer to:

- Denver School of Science and Technology, a Charter High School in Denver, Colorado
- DSST (standardized test), a Department of Defense Standardized Test
- Digit symbol substitution test
