= James F. O'Connell =

James Francis O'Connell is Distinguished Professor Emeritus of Anthropology at the University of Utah. He is a member of the National Academy of Sciences of the United States of America and is on the editorial board of the Proceedings of the National Academy of Sciences.

== Early life ==
O'Connell was born in San Francisco, California. He became interested in natural history as a child, facilitated by the California Academy of Sciences in Golden Gate Park, which was near his family home. After graduating from St. Ignatius College Preparatory, he undertook coursework at University of San Francisco for two years before he moved across the bay to attend the University of California at Berkeley.

== Career ==
O'Connell earned his undergraduate and postgraduate degrees at UC Berkeley. Working with Robert Heizer, his PhD dissertation examined the prehistoric archaeology of Surprise Valley, California. After graduation, he took a post at the University of California at Riverside for three years before accepting a research fellowship at the Australian National University (ANU). There he undertook ethnoarchaeological work with Alyawarra and Anmatjere speakers (dialects of Arrernte) near Bendaijerum station in the Northern Territory of Australia. Though originally planned as a study of site structure, O'Connell had been recently influenced by Robert MacArthur's Geographical Ecology, which led him to undertake quantitative observations of subsistence behavior in addition to studies of material remains. After several years at ANU, O'Connell accepted a position at the University of Utah.

Since arriving at Utah in 1978, O'Connell has continued to undertake ethnoarchaeological and archaeological research in Western North America and Australia. He also started additional projects in Africa, most notably his research with Hadza hunter-gatherers in Tanzania. Collaborating with Kristen Hawkes and Nicholas Blurton Jones, his research has sought to explain the evolution of human life histories, Pleistocene human hunting strategies and the emergence of the genus Homo from an evolutionary ecological perspective.

To date, he has published over 150 journal articles and book chapters, including seminal work applying evolutionary ecology to human behavior, novel ethnoarchaeological work linking behavioral ecological explanations of human behavior to its material consequences and applying these insights to prehistory. Applications of the latter include recent work directed toward understanding the Pleistocene colonization of Sahul (Pleistocene Australia/New Guinea).
