= Grandmother hypothesis =

Hypothesis on why humans have menopause

External audio
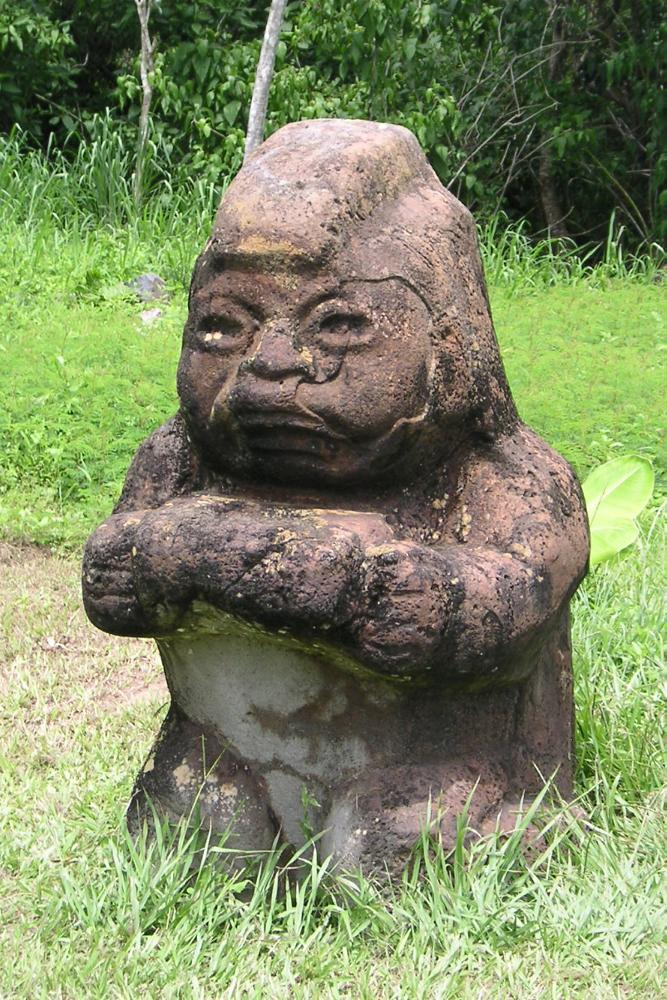
- "Grandmothers Matter: Some surprisingly controversial theories of human longevity", Science History Institute

The grandmother hypothesis is a hypothesis to explain the existence of menopause in human life history by identifying the adaptive value of extended kin networking. It builds on the previously postulated "mother hypothesis" which states that as mothers age, the costs of reproducing become greater, and energy devoted to those activities would be better spent helping her offspring in their reproductive efforts. It suggests that by redirecting their energy onto those of their offspring, grandmothers can better ensure the survival of their genes through younger generations. By providing sustenance and support to their kin, grandmothers not only ensure that their genetic interests are met, but they also enhance their social networks which could translate into better immediate resource acquisition. This effect could extend past kin into larger community networks and benefit wider group fitness.

== Background ==
One explanation to this was presented by G.C. Williams who was the first to posit, in 1957, that menopause might be an adaptation. Williams suggested that at some point it became more advantageous for women to redirect reproductive efforts into increased support of existing offspring. Since a female's dependent offspring would die as soon as she did, he argued, older mothers should stop producing new offspring and focus on those existing. In so doing, they would avoid the age-related risks associated with reproduction and thereby eliminate a potential threat to the continued survival of current offspring. The evolutionary reasoning behind this is driven by related theories.

=== Kin selection ===
Kin selection provides the framework for an adaptive strategy by which altruistic behavior is bestowed on closely related individuals because easily identifiable markers exist to indicate them as likely to reciprocate. Kin selection is implicit in theories regarding the successful propagation of genetic material through reproduction, as helping an individual more likely to share one's genetic material would better ensure the survival of at least a portion of it. Hamilton's rule suggests that individuals preferentially help those more related to them when costs to themselves are minimal. This is modeled mathematically as $rb > c$. Grandmothers would, therefore, be expected to forgo their own reproduction once the benefits of helping those individuals (b) multiplied by the relatedness to that individual (r) outweighed the costs of the grandmother not reproducing (c).

Evidence of kin selection emerged as correlated with climate-driven changes, around 1.8–1.7 million years ago, in female foraging and food sharing practices. These adjustments increased juvenile dependency, forcing mothers to opt for a low-ranked, common food source (tubers) that required adult skill to harvest and process. Such demands constrained female IBIs (Inter Birth Intervals) thus providing an opportunity for selection to favor the grandmother hypothesis.

=== Parental investment ===
Parental investment, originally put forth by Robert Trivers, is defined as any benefit a parent confers on an offspring at a cost to its ability to invest elsewhere. This theory serves to explain the dynamic sex difference in investment toward offspring observed in most species. It is evident first in gamete size, as eggs are larger and far more energetically expensive than sperm. Females are also much more sure of their genetic relationship with their offspring, as birth serves as a very reliable marker of relatedness. This paternity uncertainty that males experience makes them less likely than females to invest, since it would be costly for males to provide sustenance to another male's offspring. This translates into the grandparental generation, as grandmothers should be much more likely than grandfathers to invest energy into the offspring of their children, and more so in the offspring of their daughters than sons.

== The grandmother effect ==
Evolutionary theory dictates that all organisms invest heavily in reproduction in order to replicate their genes. According to parental investment, human females will invest heavily in their young because the number of mating opportunities available to them and how many offspring they are able to produce in a given amount of time is fixed by the biology of their sex. This inter birth interval (IBI) is a limiting factor in how many children a woman can have because of the extended developmental period that human children experience. Extended childhood, like the extended post-reproductive lifespan for females, is relatively unique to humans. Because of this correlation, human grandmothers are well-poised to provide supplemental parental care to their offspring's children. Since their grandchildren still carry a portion of their genes, it is still in the grandmother's genetic interest to ensure those children survive to reproduction.

=== Reproductive senescence ===
The mismatch between the rates of degradation of somatic cells versus gametes in human females provides an unsolved paradox. Somatic cells decline more slowly, and humans invest more in somatic longevity relative to other species. Since natural selection has a much stronger influence on younger generations, deleterious mutations during later life become harder to select out of the population.

In female placentals, the number of ovarian oocytes is fixed during embryonic development, possibly as an adaptation to reduce the accumulation of mutations, which then mature or degrade over the life course. At birth there are, typically, one million ova. However, by menopause, only approximately 400 eggs would have actually matured. In humans, the rate of follicular atresia increases at older ages (around 38–40), for reasons that are not known. In chimpanzees, our closest nonhuman, genetic relatives, recent research indicates a menopausal age of roughly 50, similar to that of human females, in captive chimpanzees, with similar findings reflected in a study of the Ngogo (Uganda) wild chimpanzee community reported in October 2023. The report of the latter study questioned the grandmother hypothesis by observing that "...chimpanzees have very different living arrangements than humans. Older female chimpanzees typically do not live near their daughters or provide care for grandchildren, yet females at Ngogo often live past their childbearing years." Previously, a very similar rate of oocyte atresia until the age of 40 had been posited in chimps and humans, at which point humans experienced a far accelerated rate compared to chimpanzees.

The aging process in humans leaves a dilemma in that females live past their ability to reproduce. The question poised to evolutionary researchers then becomes, why do human bodies live on so robustly and for so long past their reproductive potential, and could there be an adaptive benefit to abandoning one's own attempts at reproduction to assist kin?

=== Alloparenting ===
The practice of dividing parenting responsibilities among non-parents affords females a great advantage in that they can dedicate more effort and energy toward having an increased number of offspring. While this practice is observed in several species, it has been an especially successful strategy for humans who rely extensively on social networks. One observational study of the Aka foragers of Central Africa demonstrated how allomaternal investment toward an offspring increased specifically during times that the mother's investment in subsistence and economic activities increased.

If the grandmother effect were true, post-menopausal women should continue to work after the cessation of fertility and use the proceeds to preferentially provision their kin. Studies of Hadza women have provided such evidence. A modern hunter-gatherer group in Tanzania, the post-menopausal Hadza women often help their grandchildren by foraging for food staples that younger children are inefficient at acquiring successfully. Children, therefore, require the assistance of an adult to gain this crucial sustenance. Often, however, mothers are inhibited by the care of younger offspring and are less available to help their older children forage. In this regard, the Hadza grandmothers become vital to the care of existing grandchildren, and allow reproductive-age women to redirect energy from existing offspring into younger offspring or other reproductive efforts.

Some commentators felt that Hawkes et al. understated the role of Hadza men, who contribute 96% of the mean daily intake of protein - however the authors have addressed this criticism in numerous publications. Others questioned the extent of behavioral similarities between modern humans (such as the Hadza) and our hominid ancestors.

=== Maternal v. paternal grandmothers ===
Because grandmothers should be expected to provide preferential treatment to offspring she is most certain of her relationship to, there should be differences in the help she provides to each grandchild according to that relationship. Studies have found that not only does the maternal or paternal relationship of the grandparent affect whether or how much help a grandchild receives, but also what kind of help. Paternal grandmothers often had a detrimental effect on infant mortality. Also, maternal grandmothers concentrate on offspring survival, whereas paternal grandmothers increase birth rates. These finding are consistent with ideas of parental investment and paternity uncertainty. Equally, a grandmother could be both a maternal and paternal grandmother and thus in division of resources, a daughter's offspring should be favored.

Other studies have focused on the genetic relationship between grandmothers and grandchildren. Such studies have found that the effects of maternal / paternal grandmothers on grandsons / granddaughters may vary based on degree of genetic relatedness, with paternal grandmothers having positive effects on granddaughters but detrimental effects on grandsons, and paternity uncertainty may be less important than chromosome inheritance.

== Criticisms and alternative hypotheses ==
Some critics have cast doubt on the hypothesis because while it addresses how grandparental care could have maintained longer female post-reproductive lifespans, it does not provide an explanation for how it would have evolved in the first place. One theory is that the number of caregivers has a positive relationship on the likelihood of offspring reaching adulthood, suggesting that grandparents who contribute to the care of their grandchildren are more likely to have their genes passed down. Some versions of the grandmother hypothesis asserted that it helped explain the longevity of human senescence. However, demographic data has shown that historically rising numbers in older people among the population correlated with lower numbers of younger people. This suggests that at some point grandmothers were not helpful toward the survival of their grandchildren, and does not explain why the first grandmother would forgo her own reproduction to help her offspring and grandchildren.

In addition, all variations on the mother, or grandmother effect, fail to explain longevity with continued spermatogenesis in males.

Another problem concerning the grandmother hypothesis is that it requires a history of female philopatry. Though some studies suggest that hunter-gatherer societies are patriarchal, mounting evidence shows that residence is fluid among hunter-gatherers and that married women in at least one patrilineal society visit their kin during times when kin-based support can be especially beneficial to a woman's reproductive success. One study does suggest, however, that maternal kin were essential to the fitness of sons as fathers in a patrilocal society.

It also fails to explain the detrimental effects of losing ovarian follicular activity. While continued post-menopausal synthesis of estrogen occurs in peripheral tissues through the adrenal pathways, these women undoubtedly face an increased risk of conditions associated with lower levels of estrogen: osteoporosis, osteoarthritis, Alzheimer's disease and coronary artery disease.

However, cross-cultural studies of menopause have found that menopausal symptoms are quite variable among different populations, and that some populations of females do not recognize, and may not even experience, these "symptoms". This high level of variability in menopausal symptoms across populations brings into question the plausibility of menopause as a sort of "culling agent" to eliminate non-reproductive females from competition with younger, fertile members of the species. This also faces the task of explaining the paradox between the typical age for menopause onset and the life expectancy of female humans.

== See also ==
- Patriarch hypothesis
- Postpartum confinement, a worldwide tradition in which the grandmothers care for the next generation
- The How and the Why, a play based on the controversy surrounding the grandmother hypothesis and the evolution of human reproduction
