= Menopause (journal) =

- Discipline: Gynecology
- Language: English
- Edited by: Isaac Schiff

Publication details
- History: 1994-present
- Publisher: Lippincott Williams & Wilkins
- Frequency: Monthly
- Impact factor: 3.361 (2014)

Standard abbreviations
- ISO 4: Menopause

Indexing
- CODEN: MENOF2
- ISSN: 1072-3714 (print); 1530-0374 (web)
- LCCN: 94660925
- OCLC no.: 28934287

Links
- Journal homepage; Online access; Online archive

Menopause is a monthly peer-reviewed medical journal covering all aspects of gynecology dealing with topics related to menopause. It was established in 1994 and is published by Lippincott Williams & Wilkins. The editor-in-chief is Isaac Schiff (Harvard Medical School). It is an official journal of the North American Menopause Society. According to the Journal Citation Reports, the journal has a 2014 impact factor of 3.361.
