= Evolution of menopause =

There are various theories on the origin and process of the evolution of menopause. These attempt to suggest evolutionary benefits to the human species stemming from the cessation of women's reproductive capability before the end of their natural lifespan and can be categorized as adaptive and non-adaptive. Few other animals have a menopause; humans are joined by just four species in which females live substantially longer than their ability to reproduce, all cetaceans (beluga whales, narwhals, orcas and short-finned pilot whales).

== Non-adaptive hypotheses ==
The high cost of female investment in offspring may lead to physiological deteriorations that amplify susceptibility to becoming infertile. This hypothesis suggests the reproductive lifespan in humans has been optimized, but it has proven more difficult in females and thus their reproductive span is shorter. If this hypothesis were true, however, age at menopause should be negatively correlated with the amount of energy expended to maintain the reproductive organs, and the available data does not support this.

A recent increase in female longevity due to improvements in the standard of living and social care has also been suggested. It is difficult for selection, however, to favor aid to offspring from parents and grandparents. Irrespective of living standards, adaptive responses are limited by physiological mechanisms. In other words, senescence is programmed and regulated by specific genes.

=== Early human selection shadow ===
While it is fairly common for extant hunter-gatherers to live past age 50 provided that they survive childhood, fossil evidence shows that mortality in adults has decreased over the last 30,000 to 50,000 years and that it was extremely unusual for early Homo sapiens to live to age 50. This discovery has led some biologists to argue that there was no selection for or against menopause at the time at which the ancestor of all modern humans lived in Africa, suggesting that menopause is instead a random evolutionary effect of a selection shadow regarding aging in early Homo sapiens. It is also argued that since the population fraction of post-menopausal women in early Homo sapiens was so low, menopause had no evolutionary effect on mate selection or social behaviors related to mate selection.

=== Young female preference hypothesis ===
The young female preference hypothesis proposes that changes in male preferences for younger mates allowed late-age acting fertility mutations to accumulate in females without any evolutionary penalty, giving rise to menopause. A computer model was constructed to test this hypothesis, and showed that it was feasible. However, in order for deleterious mutations that affect fertility past roughly age fifty to accumulate, human maximum lifespan had to first be extended to about its present value. As of 2016 it was unclear if there has been sufficient time since that happened for such an evolutionary process to occur.

== Adaptive hypotheses ==
=== "Survival of the fittest" hypothesis ===
This hypothesis suggests that younger mothers and offspring under their care will fare better in a difficult and predatory environment because a younger mother will be stronger and more agile in providing protection and sustenance for herself and a nursing baby. The various biological factors associated with menopause had the effect of male members of the species investing their effort with the most viable of potential female mates.

A problem with this hypothesis is that, if true, we would expect to see menopause exhibited among many species in the animal kingdom, and another problem is that in the case of extended child development, even a female who was relatively young, still agile, and attractive when producing a child would lose future support from her male partner due to him seeking out fertile mates when she reaches menopause, while the child is still not independent. This would be counterproductive to the supposed adaptation of getting male support, as it would significantly decrease the survival for children produced over much of the female's fertile and agile life, unless children were raised in ways that did not rely on support from a male partner, which would eliminate the supposed evolutionary benefit anyway.

=== Male-biased philopatry hypothesis ===
The male-biased philopatry theory proposes that if human social groups were originally based around women leaving their birth communities at sexual maturity more frequently than men, then reproductive females would become more closely related to other group members as they grew older, making the inclusive fitness benefits older females receive from helping the group greater than what they would receive from continued reproduction. This in turn would lead to the evolution of menopause. By contrast, in a pattern of male-biased dispersal and local mating, the relatedness of the individuals in the group decreases with female age, leading to a decrease in kin selection with female age. This occurs because a female will stay with her father in her birth community throughout life, initially being closely related to the males and females. Females are born and stay in the group, so relatedness to the females stays about the same. However, throughout time, the older male relatives will die and any sons she gives birth to will disperse, so that local relatedness to males, and therefore the whole group, declines. The situation is reversed in species where males are philopatric and either females disperse, or mating is non-local. Under these conditions, a female's reproductive life begins away from her father and paternal relatives because she was either born into a new group from non-local mating or because she dispersed. In the case of female-biased dispersal, the female is initially equally unrelated with every individual in the group, and with non-local mating, the female is closely related to the females of the group, but not the males since her paternal relatives are in another group. As she gives birth, her sons will stay with her, increasing her relatedness to males in the group over time and thus her relatedness with the overall group. The common feature that connects these two otherwise different behaviors is male-biased philopatry, which leads to an increase in kin selection with female age.

While not conclusive, evidence does exist to support the idea that female-biased dispersal existed in pre-modern humans. The closest living relatives to humans, chimpanzees, bonobos, and both mountain gorillas and western lowland gorillas, are female-biased dispersers. Analysis of sex specific genetic material, the non-recombining portions of the Y chromosome and mitochondrial DNA, show evidence of a prevalence of female-biased dispersal as well; however, these results could also be affected by the effective breeding numbers of males and females in local populations. Evidence of female-biased dispersion in hunter-gatherers is not definitive, with some studies supporting the idea, and others suggesting there is no strong bias towards either sex. In orcas, both sexes mate non-locally with members of a different pod but return to the pod after copulation. Demographic data shows that a female's mean relatedness to the group does increase over time due to increasing relatedness to males. While less well-studied, there is evidence that short-finned pilot whales, another menopausal species, also display this behavior. However, mating behavior that increases local relatedness with female age is prevalent in non-menopausal species, making it unlikely that it is the only factor that determines if menopause will evolve in a species.

=== Mother hypothesis ===
The mother hypothesis suggests that menopause was selected for humans because of the extended development period of human offspring and high costs of reproduction so that mothers gain an advantage in reproductive fitness by redirecting their effort from new offspring with a low survival chance to existing children with a higher survival chance.

=== Grandmother hypothesis ===
The Grandmother hypothesis suggests that menopause was selected for humans because it promotes the survival of grandchildren. According to this hypothesis, post-reproductive women feed and care for children, adult nursing daughters, and grandchildren whose mothers have weaned them. Human babies require large and steady supplies of glucose to feed the growing brain. In infants in the first year of life, the brain consumes 60% of all calories, so both babies and their mothers require a dependable food supply. Some evidence suggests that hunters contribute less than half the total food budget of most hunter-gatherer societies, and often much less than half, so that foraging grandmothers can contribute substantially to the survival of grandchildren at times when mothers and fathers are unable to gather enough food for all of their children. In general, selection operates most powerfully during times of famine or other privation. So although grandmothers might not be necessary during good times, many grandchildren cannot survive without them during times of famine. Post-reproductive female orcas tend to lead their pods, especially during years of food scarcity. Furthermore, the increased mortality risk of an orca due to losing a grandmother is stronger in years of food scarcity.

Analysis of historical data found that the length of a female's post-reproductive lifespan was reflected in the reproductive success of her offspring and the survival of her grandchildren. Another study found comparative effects but only in the maternal grandmother—paternal grandmothers had a detrimental effect on infant mortality (probably due to paternity uncertainty). Differing assistance strategies for maternal and paternal grandmothers have also been demonstrated. Maternal grandmothers concentrate on offspring survival, whereas paternal grandmothers increase birth rates.

Some believe variations on the mother, or grandmother effect fail to explain longevity with continued spermatogenesis in males (oldest verified paternity is 94 years, 35 years beyond the oldest documented birth attributed to females). Notably, the survival time past menopause is roughly the same as the maturation time for a human child. That a mother's presence could aid in the survival of a developing child, while an unidentified father's absence might not have affected survival, could explain the paternal fertility near the end of the father's lifespan. A man with no certainty of which children are his may merely attempt to father additional children, with support of existing children present but small. Note the existence of partible paternity supporting this. Some argue that the mother and grandmother hypotheses fail to explain the detrimental effects of losing ovarian follicular activity, such as osteoporosis, osteoarthritis, Alzheimer's disease and coronary artery disease.

The theories discussed above assume that evolution directly selected for menopause. Another theory states that menopause is the byproduct of the evolutionary selection for follicular atresia, a factor that causes menopause. Menopause results from having too few ovarian follicles to produce enough estrogen to maintain the ovarian-pituitary-hypothalamic loop, which results in the cessation of menses and the beginning of menopause. Human females are born with approximately a million oocytes, and approximately 400 oocytes are lost to ovulation throughout life.

=== Reproductive conflict hypothesis ===
In social vertebrates, the sharing of resources among the group places limits on how many offspring can be produced and supported by members of the group. This creates a situation in which each female must compete with others of the group to ensure they are the one that reproduces. The reproductive conflict hypothesis proposes that this female reproductive conflict favors the cessation of female reproductive potential in older age to avoid reproductive conflict, increasing the older female's fitness through inclusive benefits. Female-biased dispersal or non-local mating leads to an increase in relatedness to the social group with female age. In the human case of female-biased dispersal, when a young female enters a new group, she is not related to any individual and she reproduces to produce an offspring with a relatedness of 0.5. An older female could also choose to reproduce, producing an offspring with a relatedness of 0.5, or she could refrain from reproducing and allow another pair to reproduce. Because her relatedness to males in the group is high, there is a fair probability that the offspring will be her grandchild with a relatedness of 0.25. The younger female experiences no cost to her inclusive fitness from using the resources necessary to successfully rear offspring since she is not related to members of the group, but there is a cost for the older female. As a result, the younger female has the advantage in reproductive competition. Although a female orca born into a social group is related to some members of the group, the whale case of non-local mating leads to similar outcomes because the younger female relatedness to the group as a whole is less than the relatedness of the older female. This behavior makes more likely the cessation of reproduction late in life to avoid reproductive conflict with younger females.

Research using both human and orca demographic data has been published that supports the role of reproductive conflict in the evolution of menopause. Analysis of demographic data from pre-industrial Finnish populations found significant reductions in offspring survivorship when mothers-in-laws and daughters-in-laws had overlapping births, supporting the idea that avoiding reproductive conflict is beneficial to offspring survivorship. Humans, more so than other primates, rely on food sharing for survival, so the large survivorship reduction values could be caused by a straining of community resources. Avoiding such straining is a possible explanation for why the reproductive overlap seen in humans is much lower than other primates. Food sharing is also prevalent among another menopausal species, orcas. Reproductive conflict has also been observed in orcas, with increased calf mortality seen when reproductive overlap between a younger and older generational female occurred.

== See also ==
- Disposable soma theory of aging
- Patriarch hypothesis
