= Lara Briden =

Canadian naturopath and author (born 1969)

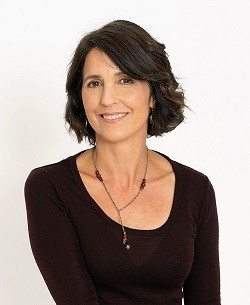
- Lara Briden, 2018
- Born: Lara Grinevitch; December 31, 1969 (age 56); Edmonton, Alberta, Canada
- Education: Canadian College of Naturopathic Medicine CCNM, 1997
- Years active: 1998-present
- Medical career
- Profession: Naturopathic Doctor
- Sub-specialties: Women’s Health
- Notable works: Period Repair Manual, 2015; Hormone Repair Manual, 2021
- Website: larabriden.com

Lara Briden (née Grinevitch, born 1969) is a naturopath, women’s health speaker, and author of the books Period Repair Manual, Hormone Repair Manual, and Metabolism Repair for Women, published by Pan Macmillan. She has consulting rooms in Christchurch, New Zealand, and travels widely to speak on women’s health.

== Early life ==
Lara Grinevitch was born in 1969 in Edmonton, Alberta.

== Education and career ==
Briden is a 1993 graduate of the University of Calgary and 1997 graduate of the Canadian College of Naturopathic Medicine. She has a Bachelor of Science degree in evolutionary biology and worked as an evolutionary biology researcher at the University of Calgary from 1990-1993. From 1993-1997 she studied at CCNM, to become a Doctor of Naturopathic Medicine.

From 1997 to 2002, Briden worked in private practice in rural Alberta. In 2002 she moved to Sydney, Australia where she established a practice focusing on women’s health issues.

In 2015 she moved to Christchurch, New Zealand, but continued to travel regularly to Sydney to provide ongoing care for her Australian patients.

Briden is a regular speaker on women’s health issues, writes for a variety of publications and health-related websites, and is a regular guest on health-related podcasts.

== Publications ==
=== Period Repair Manual ===
In February 2015, Briden published her first book, Period Repair Manual. The second edition was picked up by Pan Macmillan for the Australia/New Zealand market in 2018.

==== Additional language translations ====
- Spanish translation: “Cómo mejorar tu ciclo menstrual”, published in 2019.
- German translation: “Die Perioden-Werkstatt”, published in 2018.
- French translation: "Régéneréz votre cycle menstruel", published in 2025.
- Brazilian Portuguese translation: "O Que Nunca Te Contaram Sobre Seu Ciclo Menstrual", published in 2021.
- Italian translation: "Rigenera il tuo ciclo mestruale", published in 2024.
- Dutch translation: “Grip op je cyclus”, published in 2021.
- Russian translation: "Менструация: руководство по эксплуатации", published in 2020.
- Korean translation: "나의 진짜 월경 찾기", published in 2024.
- Bulgarian translation: "Наръчник за Регулиране на Месечния Цикъл", published in 2023.
- Czech translation: "Jak si zlepšit menstruační cyklus", published in 2021.
- Lithuanian translation: "Moters ciklo sutrikimai", published in 2023.
- Estonian translation: “Paremate päevade käsiraamat”, published in 2019.
- Further language translations are under way.

=== Hormone Repair Manual ===
Briden's second book, Hormone Repair Manual, on the topic of perimenopause and menopause, was published by Pan Macmillan in February 2021.

==== Additional language translations ====
- Spanish translation: “Cómo mejorar tu salud hormonal”, published in 2021.
- Dutch translation: “Grip op de overgang”, published in 2021.

=== Metabolism Repair for Women ===
Briden’s third book, Metabolism Repair for Women, on the topic of metabolic inflexibility, balancing insulin, losing weight, was published by GreenPeak Publishing in June 2024. In Australia and New Zealand the same book is published under the title The Metabolism Reset, and is published by Pan Macmillan.

=== Peer-reviewed papers ===
- “The central role of ovulatory disturbances in the etiology of androgenic polycystic ovary syndrome (PCOS)—Evidence for treatment with cyclic progesterone”, December 2020, Drug Discovery Today: Disease Models.
- “Beyond the Label: A Patient-Centred Approach to Polycystic Ovary Syndrome”, Vol. 29 No. 2 (2022), CAND Journal.

== Scientific advisor ==
- Member of the scientific advisory council for the Centre for Menstrual Cycle and Ovulation Research (CeMCOR) at the University of British Columbia.
- Member of the medical advisory board of Talk Peach Gynaecological Cancer Foundation.
- Member of the Endometriosis Special Interest Group (ESIG) of Endometriosis New Zealand.
- Editorial board CAND Journal, the official journal of the Canadian Association of Naturopathic Doctors.
