= Patriarch hypothesis =

Hypothesis on the occurrence of human menopause

The patriarch hypothesis is a hypothesis that explains the occurrence of menopause in human females and how a long post-fertile period (up to one third of a female's life-span) could confer an evolutionary advantage. It is an alternative theory to the grandmother hypothesis which tends to ignore male benefits of continued spermatogenesis and their roles in assistance.

The patriarch hypothesis incorporates these neglected areas. It suggests selection pressure on male longevity extended the female lifespan; whose adjustment of life history has been constrained by the size of the ovaries – resulting in human females surviving beyond the age at which they can reproduce. With an extension of the post-reproductive female life stage, they could enhance their inclusive fitness by giving kin assistance. This way, with no choice in the timing of fertility termination, females are optimising an essentially bad situation.

Frank Marlowe first put forward the patriarch hypothesis. He postulates that if women survive beyond an age at which they can reproduce and men continue spermatogenesis, then old males can benefit greatly if they can copulate with younger females. It is theorised that increased use of tools and weapons compensates for the decline in natural fighting ability with age. This serves to produce a more stable male hierarchy, where attainment of high social status and reproductive access is less reliant on physical strength.

With such a scenario older males are able to retain a competitive ability with younger males, thereby asserting a selection pressure on extending longevity in males that could retain social status. Higher ranking males may also be a more attractive mate choice. One mechanism that could extend the lifespan is delaying the age at maturity. Offspring with a slower life history would exhibit a protracted period of dependence. If depletion of oocytes occurs at age 50, females should selectively counter this as it reduces their fecundity.

Recruitment of help from kin and husbands may compensate by enabling females to reduce birth intervals by weaning offspring at an earlier age. In addition, by passing on longevity to her sons, a female would stand to gain inclusive fitness.

== Criticism ==
Some of the criticisms include the fact that actually most fathers, especially first time fathers, are predominantly under 40, and only one percent of 1st time fathers are above 50. Even in today's hunter-gather societies, younger males are preferred by women and their parents as husbands, as hunting and rearing children require extensive strength that tools can't compensate for in elderly males. And because demographic data has shown that historically rising numbers in older people among the population correlated with lower numbers of younger people, this means that more elderly men do not result in more children, quite the opposite. Frank Marlowe also fails to explain the pressure on men to reproduce in later life, especially with the fact that the genetic quality and the survival of a fetus of an elderly male is lower than that with a young father, making having a child with an elderly man risky for a woman. It also fails to consider the fact that reproducing sperm is much less costly than reproducing eggs, bearing the young and feeding them, which means there is no need for the elderly man to stop his spermatogenesis even if it's almost useless. Furthermore, men are much more likely to die earlier than women and have more cancers than them, sex hormones play a significant role in this.

== Evidence for ==
The patriarch hypothesis rests on three assumptions:

- Older males can reproduce.
  It is clear that older males do reproduce, as the oldest verified paternity is 94 years, 35 years beyond the oldest documented birth attributed to females.
- The allele for slowing life history and extending longevity is not on the Y chromosome.
  To date a ‘longevity’ gene(s) is still elusive. However, INK4a/ARF situated on the human chromosome 9p21 does appear to act as a tumour suppressor therefore extending longevity.
- Increasing the ovarian follicular reserve is difficult.
  There are few explanations on density restrictive mechanisms other than physical size. NOS3 has been proposed as a candidate gene for the regulation and timing of reproductive functions, such as menopause, although it is unclear why timing has not adjusted with longevity. More importantly there is a lack of understanding why 70–99.9% of mammalian follicles are subjected to atresia. Future analysis of the differential expression of genes of the bcl-2 family may hold the key.

Longevity is a central determinant of the grandmother hypothesis; selection for greater longevity in males, as suggested by the patriarch hypothesis, could extend female lifespan, provided such a gene is not on the Y chromosome. Males have much to gain from late reproduction, even if they die shortly after conception. Females that found their longevity extended, were constrained by the difficulties of increasing their follicular reserves and thus could enhance their inclusive fitness by giving kin assistance.

However, the hypothesis is committing a fallacy in which it starts with the conclusion that it's supposed to prove. The author starts with the fact that women go through menopause to reach a conclusion of male longevity instead of trying to prove it.
