= Centre for Menstrual Cycle and Ovulation Research =

Health research centre

The Centre for Menstrual Cycle and Ovulation Research (CeMCOR) is a health research centre in Vancouver. According to the University of British Columbia, CeMCOR is the only centre in the world that focuses on ovulation and the causes and consequences of ovulation disturbances. CeMCOR is known for research on progesterone-only therapy for menopausal hot flushes, research on perimenopause as distinct from menopause, and for a focus on women's perspectives and self-knowledge.

== History ==
The Centre was founded by Dr. Jerilynn Prior in May 2002 as a charity affiliated with the University of British Columbia. The stated vision was to "reframe scientific knowledge of the menstrual cycle and ovulation in a woman-centered context."

CeMCOR is now located at Vancouver General Hospital in the Gordon and Leslie Diamond Health Care Centre. Staff includes 15 clinicians and 9 trainees. It is guided by both a Community Advisory Council and a Scientific Advisory Council composed of endocrinologists, epidemiologists, gynecologists, nutritionists, psychologists, and sociologists.

== Research ==
CeMCOR published over 50 scientific papers in its first 10 years, as well as 4 books. Areas of research include menstruation and ovulation, bone health, premenopausal breast cancer, polyendocrine metabolic ovarian syndrome (PMOS), and perimenopause. CeMCOR has stated that its research shows overall that regular menstrual cycles with ovulation help prevent osteoporosis, breast cancer, and heart disease. Dr. Prior has called menstrual cycles "a vital sign".

CeMCOR does not conduct research funded by the pharmaceutical industry.

== See also ==
- PolyAnalytik
