= Greene Menopause Index =

The Greene Menopause Index, also known as the Greene Climacteric Scale, is a questionnaire a tool used by researchers to study the symptoms of menopause. It is a standard list of 21 questions, divided into three categories (psychological, somatic, and vasomotor), which women use to rate how much they are bothered by menopause symptoms such as hot flashes, night sweats, rapid heartbeat, and difficulty sleeping.
