= Four boxes test =

Used to measure postoperative cognitive dysfunction

- Purpose: measure reaction time

The four boxes test is a computer-based test used to measure reaction times. In the test, a black circle appears in one of four boxes on the screen, and the patient presses the corresponding key on the keyboard as quickly as possible. The next circle appears after 500 ms, until 52 circles have been exposed. The computer measures the time the subject takes to complete the test and the number of errors they make.

The test has been used to measure long-term cognitive dysfunction in elderly people who have undergone an operation. When subjects had undergone anesthesia with different drugs, and were then tested using the Stroop Colour and Word Interference Test, the digit symbol substitution test and the four boxes test, recovery times varied both by anesthetic and by type of test. Other studies have shown that there is an association between postoperative cognitive dysfunction (POCD) and impaired performance in the four boxes test, but that the test is not a good predictor of POCD.
