= Kristen Hawkes =

American anthropologist

- Education: University of Washington Iowa State University
- Occupation: Professor of Anthropology
- Employer: University of Utah

Kristen Hawkes is an American anthropologist, currently a professor at University of Utah. In 2021 she was elected to the American Philosophical Society.

== Education ==
Hawkes received a bachelor's degree in Sociology and Anthropology from Iowa State University and a Masters in Anthropology from the University of Washington. She was awarded a PhD in Anthropology for her research into kinship and cooperation among the Binumarien a highland community in New Guinea.

== Research ==
Hawkes, an expert in human evolution and sociobiology, is the author of several studies on the “grandmother hypothesis,” which asserts that many of the characteristics that distinguish us from our ape ancestors are thanks to the thoughtful care of our mothers' mothers. Hawkes' studies showed that elderly women did a lot of foraging, thus helping to feed her daughter's grandchildren, keeping them both healthy. Her research is based on ethnographic observation studies of hunter-gatherer communities such as the Aché and Hadza. She has also developed mathematical models to model evolution over time and trace the influence of grandmothers on human lifespan. Combining mathematical modelling and observational studies she also researches the effects of fire on ancient hunter-gatherers.

== See also ==
- Grandmother hypothesis
