= Naturopathic Physicians Licensing Examinations =

Cover of the 2009 NPLEX Study Guide.

The Naturopathic Physicians Licensing Examinations (NPLEX) are professional licensing exams administered by the North American Board of Naturopathic Examiners (NABNE). Graduates of naturopathic programs accredited by the Council on Naturopathic Medical Education (CNME) are required to pass the exams before being permitted to practice naturopathic medicine in a U.S. state or Canadian province that licenses naturopaths. (Some naturopaths who graduated prior to the advent of the NPLEX were licensed by examinations administered by state licensing boards.)

There are concerns that the NPLEX does not test naturopathic examinees on the knowledge necessary for the practice of primary care medicine. However, naturopathic advocates claim that the NPLEX is equivalent to other standard medical licensing examinations, such as the USMLE and COMLEX-USA, but this has not been established by independent analysts due to the exam being withheld from external review. Unlike the USMLE and COMLEX-USA, the NPLEX is exclusively a written, multiple-choice exam and, therefore, does not contain sections to test clinical skills on modeled patients.

== Performance and quality ==
Clinical case and questions illustrating the use of homeopathic products to treat an eight-year-old child in respiratory distress with tachypnea and gasping respiration, from 2009 NPLEX official study guide.

Very little is known about the NPLEX exam, and it has been called a mystery by those outside the naturopathic community. No external review has been conducted on the NPLEX to assess whether examinees can safely and effectively diagnose and treat disease using established medical standards. The exam has been criticized by David Gorski for testing knowledge of homeopathy, whilst serving as a legitimate certifying examination of alleged medical professionals.

One section of this official study guide explains a clinical scenario of an after hours phone call to a naturopathic practitioner from a frantic mother with a child who has a severe cough and is gasping for air; the following example questions do not recommend that the mother take the child to the emergency department per the medical standard of care but rather test on what homeopathic remedy should be administered.

In 2005, the Colorado Department of Regulatory Agencies concluded that "there is little generalizable evidence that the NPLEX Part II clinical licensing examinations actually measure clinical competence" associated with the naturopathic profession. The report notes that NABNE, the exam administrator, claims that other testing formats that would better evaluate clinical skills, such as using standardized patients, are not feasible. In 2014, sample questions from the NPLEX Blue Print and Study Guide published by NABNE were entered into the public record of the Colorado state legislature.

== Part I ==
Part I is a biomedical sciences examination which consists of 200 multiple-choice questions. Eligibility for the exam requires completion of biomedical sciences coursework at a CNME-approved naturopathic medicine program. The exam is stated to cover the following topics: Anatomy, Biochemistry, Microbiology, Pathology, and Physiology.

== Part II ==
Part II is a three-day, examination of naturopathic clinical sciences; it includes 3 main sections and 2 electives, organized in clinical cases with several multiple-choice questions about each case. The exam is stated to cover the following topics:

- Botanical medicine
- Laboratory diagnosis and diagnostic imaging
- Emergency medicine
- Homeopathy
- Nutrition
- Pharmacology
- Physical & clinical diagnosis
- Physical medicine
- Psychology
- Research

Clinical Elective Sections (for certificate or licensure in some U.S. states)

- Acupuncture
- Minor Surgery
- Pharmacology (as of August 2017)

== Locations ==
Both the Part I and Part II examinations are offered twice a year in nine locations in North America:

- Toronto, Ontario
- Vancouver, British Columbia
- Seattle, Washington
- Portland, Oregon
- Mesa, Arizona
- Lombard, Illinois
- Stratford, Connecticut
- San Diego, CA
- Gurabo, Puerto Rico

== See also ==
- Medical education in the United States
- Naturopathy
- USMLE
- COMLEX-USA
- Medical Council of Canada Qualifying Examination
