= Menopause =

Time when menstrual periods stop permanently

- Other names: Climacteric
- Specialty: Gynecology
- Symptoms: No menstrual periods for a year
- Duration: 5–15 years
- Causes: Usually a natural change. Can also be caused by surgery that removes both ovaries, and some types of chemotherapy.
- Diagnostic method: Based on symptoms
- Treatment: Lifestyle changes, Hormone Replacement Therapy (HRT), vaginal moisturizers or lubricants, other medication, dietary supplements, therapy
- Medication: Menopausal hormone therapy, clonidine, gabapentin, selective serotonin reuptake inhibitors, lisdexamfetamine

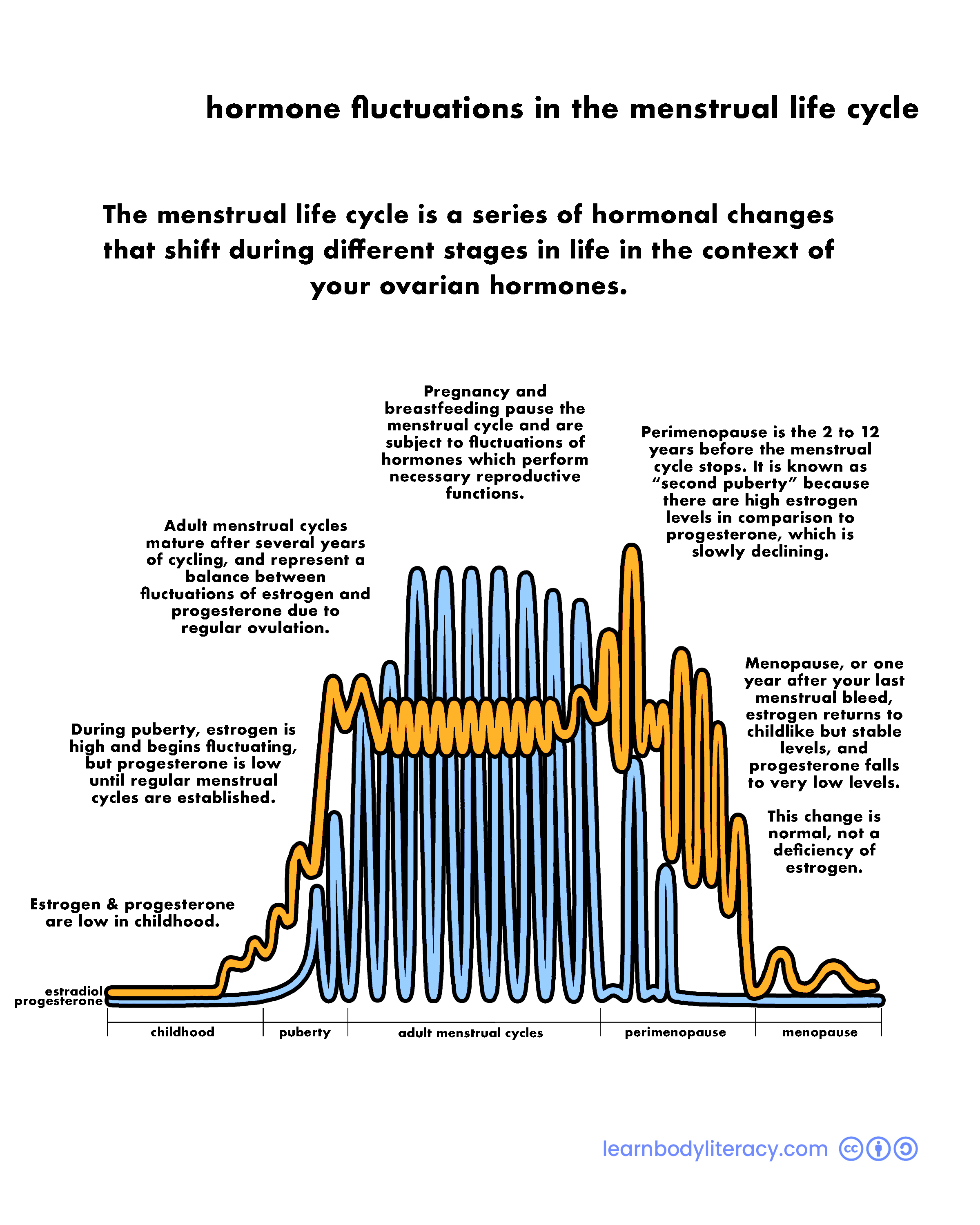
Тhe changes in ovarian hormones throughout the human lifespan. During childhood, hormone levels are low. During puberty, estrogen begins to fluctuate, followed by progesterone when you first begin ovulating. After 6-12 years the menstrual cycle normalizes into a rhythm during the menstrual years, barring any reproductive health issues or pregnancy and breastfeeding, which pauses the cycling. Perimenopause, similar to puberty, has high fluctuations of estrogen as progesterone slowly begins to decline. Eventually, a person stops ovulating, reaches menopause, and hormones return to childlike levels with low progesterone.

Menopause is the time when menstrual periods permanently stop, marking the end of the reproductive phase for female humans. The menopausal transition can be divided into three stages: perimenopause, menopause and postmenopause. Menopause is a natural part of aging, it can also be a result of surgery, or have another medical or non-medical source. Natural menopause is the result of a decrease in the production of the hormones estrogen and progesterone. Natural menopause occurs between the ages of 45 and 59, although the exact timing can vary occurring earlier or later for a variety of reasons, for example tobacco use may result in an earlier menopause while having been pregnant may result in a later menopause. Surgical menopause occurs as the result of a surgery that removes both ovaries. Surgical removal of the ovaries or ovarian failure before the age of 40 years is termed "premature ovarian insufficiency". A marked decrease in hormone levels can have other sources, including some types of chemotherapy. Women often notice symptoms of hormonal changes prior to any formal diagnosis, tests which measure hormone levels in blood or urine can confirm menopause.

In the years before menopause, a woman's periods typically become irregular, which means that periods may be longer or shorter in duration, or be lighter or heavier in the amount of flow. During this time, women often experience hot flashes; these typically last from 30 seconds to ten minutes and may be associated with shivering, night sweats and reddening of the skin. Hot flashes can recur for four to five years. Other symptoms may include vaginal dryness, urinary frequency and urgency, trouble sleeping and mood changes. The severity of symptoms varies between women. Menopause is also known to cause thinning and drying of the skin as 30% of the skin's collagen is lost during the first five years of menopause.

In addition to symptoms (hot flushes/flashes, night sweats, mood changes, arthralgia and vaginal dryness), the physical consequences of menopause include bone loss, increased central abdominal fat, and adverse changes in a woman's cholesterol profile and vascular function. These changes predispose postmenopausal women to increased risks of osteoporosis and bone fracture, and of cardio-metabolic disease (diabetes and cardiovascular disease).

Medical professionals often define menopause as having occurred when a woman has not had any menstrual bleeding for a year. It may also be defined by a decrease in hormone production by the ovaries. In those who have had surgery to remove their uterus but still have functioning ovaries, menopause is not considered to have yet occurred. Following the removal of the uterus, symptoms of menopause typically occur earlier. Iatrogenic menopause occurs when both ovaries are surgically removed (oophorectomy) along with the uterus for medical reasons. A survey in 2023 found that less than one-third of the obstetrics and gynecology resident programs offer standardized menopause curriculum, leading to incorrect diagnosis and referrals to specialists for individual symptoms rather than offering treatment for the underlying menopausal source of the symptoms.

Medical treatment of menopause, including hormonal and non-hormonal therapies are used in the treatment of menopause. Complementary medicine and alternative medicine therapies are also used for symptom management. Medical treatment includes Menopausal hormone therapy(MHT) as well as non-hormonal therapies. MHT is an effective medical treatment used both to ameliorate symptoms, such as: hot flashes, neurocognitive impairments, joint pain and vaginal dryness, and to prevent bone loss and changes to metabolism, blood vessels and the heart, that can result from the menopausal transition. Many of the concerns about the use of MHT raised by older studies are no longer considered barriers to MHT in healthy women. In some cases non-hormonal therapies are needed or preferred. Non-hormonal therapies for hot flashes include cognitive-behavioral therapy, clinical hypnosis, gabapentin and fezolinetant or selective serotonin reuptake inhibitors. Neurocognitive symptoms of menopause can be treated with lisdexamfetamine. Mild symptoms may be improved with lifestyle changes. With respect to hot flashes, avoiding nicotine, caffeine and alcohol is often recommended; sleeping naked in a cool room and using a fan may help. Exercise may help with sleep disturbances. As of 2021, scientists had found little evidence for the effectiveness of supplements and herbal remedies; however, research is ongoing.

== Stages of menstrual cycle changes ==
According to the gold-standard STRAW +10 framework, the transition is divided into clear and biological milestones: premenopause covers regular cycles; perimenopause is explicitly defined by a persistent cycle length variation of over 7 days or skipped cycles of over 60 days; and menopause is confirmed retroactively after 12 consecutive months without bleeding.

- Premenopause: The entire reproductive lifespan leading up to perimenopause. Hormone levels are stable and cycles are regular.
- Perimenopause: An initial transitional phase before menopause; Estrogen drops and spikes erratically. New symptoms may arise as a result of the fluctuations. Perimenopuase symptoms can begin late 30s or early-to-mid-40s.
- Menopause: A specific point in time, defined retroactively once a woman has gone 12 consecutive months without a period (and without an underlying medical cause or medication causing the absence).

== Signs and symptoms ==
An awareness video about Menopause

Symptoms of menopause

During early menopause transition, the menstrual cycles remain regular but the interval between cycles begins to lengthen. Hormone levels begin to fluctuate. Ovulation may not occur with each cycle.

The term menopause refers to a point in time that follows one year after the last menstruation. During the menopausal transition and after menopause, women can experience a range of symptoms. However, for women who enter the menopause transition without having regular menstrual cycles (due to prior surgery, other medical conditions or ongoing hormonal contraception) the menopause cannot be identified by bleeding patterns and is defined as the permanent loss of ovarian function.

=== Vagina, uterus and bladder (urogenital tract) ===
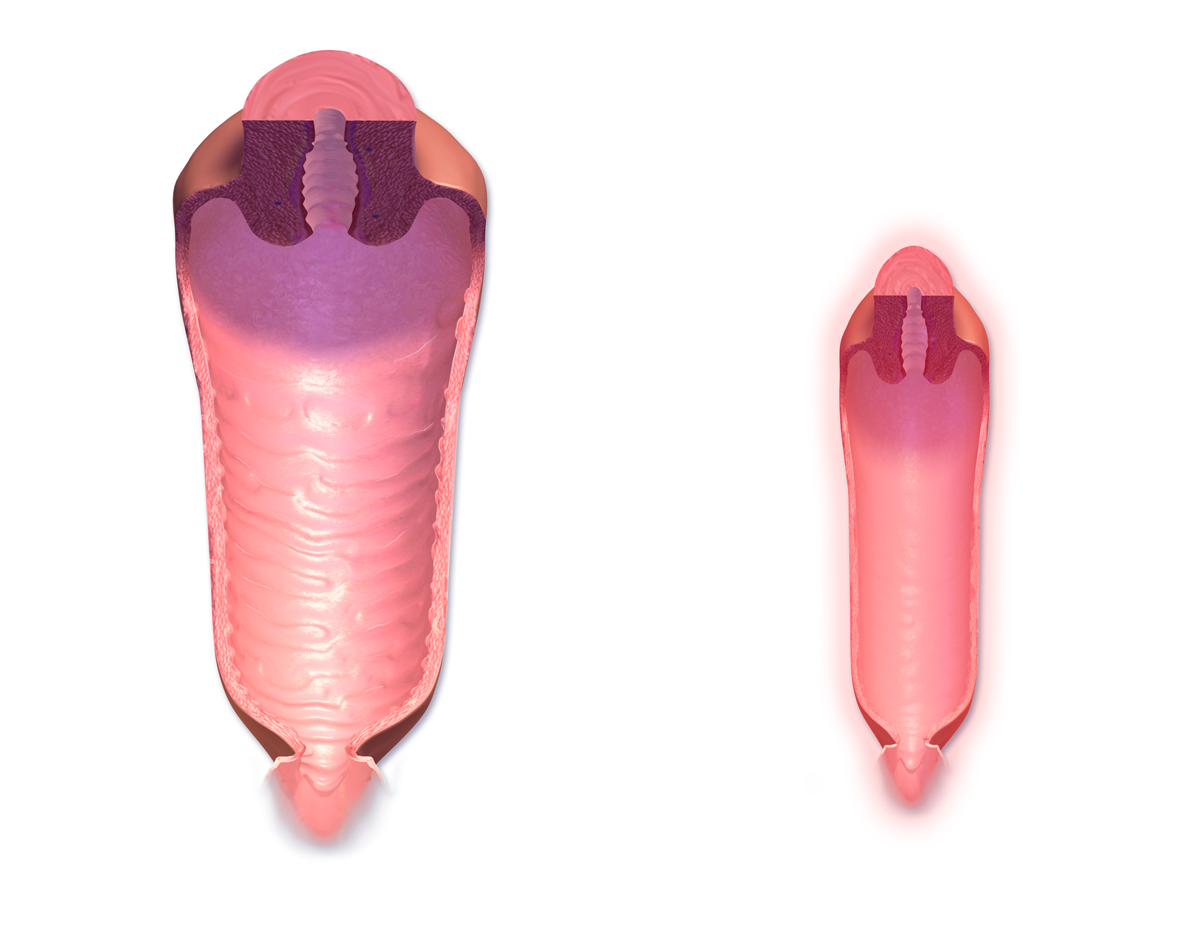
Size of the vaginal canal before and after menopause, demonstrating vaginal atrophy

During the transition to menopause, menstrual patterns can show shorter cycling (by 2–7 days); longer cycles remain possible. There may be irregular bleeding (lighter, heavier, spotting). Dysfunctional uterine bleeding is often experienced by women approaching menopause due to the hormonal changes that accompany the menopause transition. Spotting or bleeding may simply be related to vaginal atrophy, a benign sore (polyp or lesion), or may be a functional endometrial response. The European Menopause and Andropause Society has released guidelines for assessment of the endometrium, which is usually the main source of spotting or bleeding.

In post-menopausal women, however, any unscheduled vaginal bleeding is of concern and requires an appropriate investigation to rule out the possibility of malignant diseases. Urogenital symptoms may appear during menopause and continue through postmenopause and include painful intercourse, vaginal dryness and atrophic vaginitis (thinning of the membranes of the vulva, the vagina, the cervix and the outer urinary tract). There may also be considerable shrinking and loss in elasticity of all of the outer and inner genital areas. Urinary urgency may also occur and urinary incontinence in some women.

=== Other physical effects ===
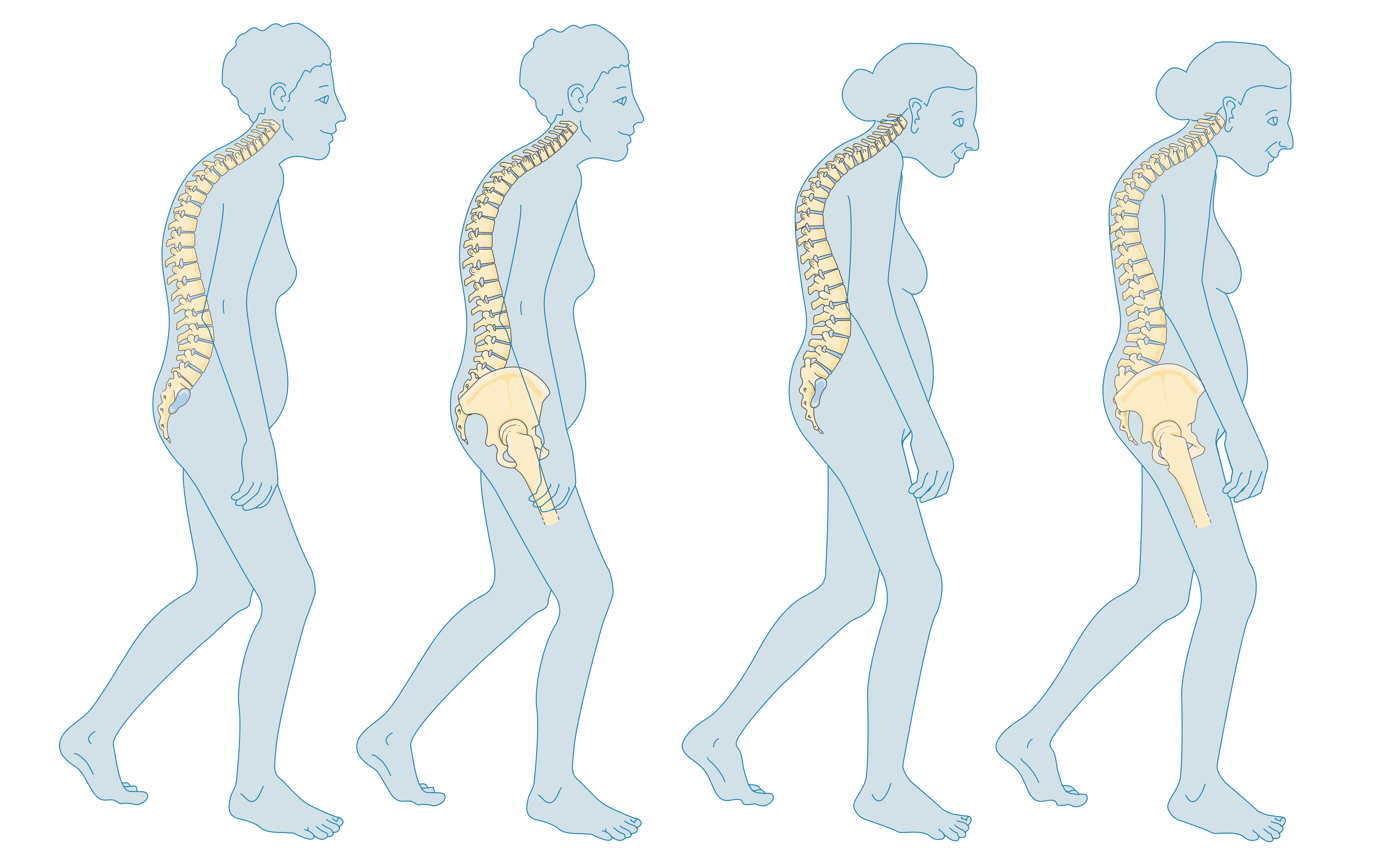
Bone mineral density, especially of the vertebrae, decreases with menopause.

The most common physical symptoms of menopause are heavy night sweats and hot flashes (also known as vasomotor symptoms). Sleeping problems and insomnia are also common. Other physical symptoms may be reported that are not specific to menopause but may be exacerbated by it, such as lack of energy, joint soreness, stiffness, back pain, breast enlargement, breast pain, heart palpitations, headache, dizziness, dry, itchy skin, thinning of the skin, tingling skin, rosacea, weight gain. Hair loss and brittle nails may also occur as a result of lowering estrogen and progesterone levels.

=== Cognitive symptoms and mood shifts ===
Psychological symptoms are often reported but may not always be specific to menopause and can be caused by other factors. Meanwhile, cognitive symptoms can include anxiety, poor memory, inability to concentrate (brain fog), depressive mood, irritability and fatigue, mood swings and less interest in sexual activity.

Cognitive and mood symptoms are driven by the brain adjusting to a low-estrogen environmentand could be aided by Hormone Replacement Therapy (HRT) with the guidance of a medical professional. Menopause-related cognitive impairment can be confused with the mild cognitive impairment that precedes dementia. There is evidence of small decreases in verbal memory, on average, which may be caused by the effects of declining estrogen levels on the brain, or perhaps by reduced blood flow to the brain during hot flashes. However, these tend to resolve for most women during the postmenopause. Subjective reports of memory and concentration problems are associated with several factors, such as lack of sleep and stress.

=== Long-term effects ===
==== Cardiovascular health ====
Exposure to endogenous estrogen during reproductive years provides women with protection against cardiovascular disease, which is lost around 10 years after the onset of menopause. The menopausal transition is associated with an increase in fat mass (predominantly in visceral fat) and metabolic dysfunction–associated steatotic liver disease, an increase in insulin resistance, dyslipidaemia and endothelial dysfunction. Women with vasomotor symptoms during menopause seem to have an especially unfavorable cardiometabolic profile, as well as women with premature onset of menopause (before 45 years of age). These risks can be reduced by managing risk factors, such as tobacco smoking, hypertension, increased blood lipids and body weight.

==== Bone health ====
The annual rates of bone mineral density loss are highest starting one year before the final menstrual period and continuing through the two years after it. Thus, post menopausal women are at increased risk of osteopenia, osteoporosis and fractures.

Estrogen normally inhibits the process by which bone is broken down; declining and fluctuating estrogen levels during perimenopause and menopause can therefore contribute to accelerated bone loss and osteopenia.

== Causes ==
Menopause is a normal event in a woman's life and is a natural part of aging. While all women experience perimenopause and menopause, symptoms can vary widely from woman to woman. Menopause can also be induced early. Induced menopause occurs as a result of medical treatment such as chemotherapy, radiotherapy, oophorectomy, or complications of tubal ligation, hysterectomy, unilateral or bilateral salpingo-oophorectomy or leuprorelin usage.

=== Age ===
Menopause typically occurs at some point between 47 and 54 years of age. According to various data, more than 95% of women have their last period between the ages of 44–56 (median 49–50). 2% of women under the age of 40, 5% between the ages of 40–45 and the same number between the ages of 55–58 have their last bleeding. The average age of the last period in the United States is 51 years, in Russia is 50 years, in Greece is 49 years, in Turkey is 47 years, in Egypt is 47 years and in India is 46 years. Beyond the influence of genetics, these differences are also due to early-life environmental conditions and associated with epigenetic effects. The menopausal transition or perimenopause leading up to menopause usually lasts 3–4 years (sometimes as long as 5–14 years).

=== Early menopause ===
Early menopause happens before the age of 45. Undiagnosed and untreated coeliac disease is a risk factor for early menopause. Coeliac disease can present with several non-gastrointestinal symptoms, in the absence of gastrointestinal symptoms, and most cases escape timely recognition and go undiagnosed, leading to a risk of long-term complications. A strict gluten-free diet reduces the risk. Women with early diagnosis and treatment of coeliac disease present a normal duration of fertile life span. Women who have undergone hysterectomy with ovary conservation go through menopause on average 1.5 years earlier than the expected age.

=== Primary ovarian insufficiency ===
In rare cases, a woman's ovaries stop working at a very early age, ranging anywhere from the age of puberty to age 40. This is known as primary ovarian insufficiency or premature ovarian insufficiency (POI) and affects 1 to 2% of women by age 40. It is diagnosed or confirmed by high blood levels of follicle stimulating hormone (FSH) and luteinizing hormone (LH) on at least three occasions at least four weeks apart.

Primary ovarian insufficiency may be related to an autoimmune disorder and therefore might co-occur with other autoimmune disorders such as thyroid disease [adrenal insufficiency] and diabetes mellitus. Other causes include chemotherapy, being a carrier of the fragile X syndrome gene and radiotherapy. However, in about 50–80% of cases of premature ovarian insufficiency, the cause is unknown (idiopathic).

=== Surgical menopause ===
Menopause can be surgically induced by bilateral oophorectomy (removal of ovaries), which is often, but not always, done in conjunction with removal of the fallopian tubes (salpingo-oophorectomy) and uterus (hysterectomy). Cessation of menses as a result of removal of the ovaries is called "surgical menopause". Surgical treatments, such as the removal of ovaries, might cause periods to stop altogether. The sudden and complete drop in hormone levels may produce extreme withdrawal symptoms such as hot flashes, etc. The symptoms of early menopause may be more severe.

Removal of the uterus without removal of the ovaries does not directly cause menopause, although pelvic surgery of this type can often precipitate a somewhat earlier menopause, perhaps because of a compromised blood supply to the ovaries. The time between surgery and possible early menopause is due to the fact that ovaries are still producing hormones.

== Mechanism ==
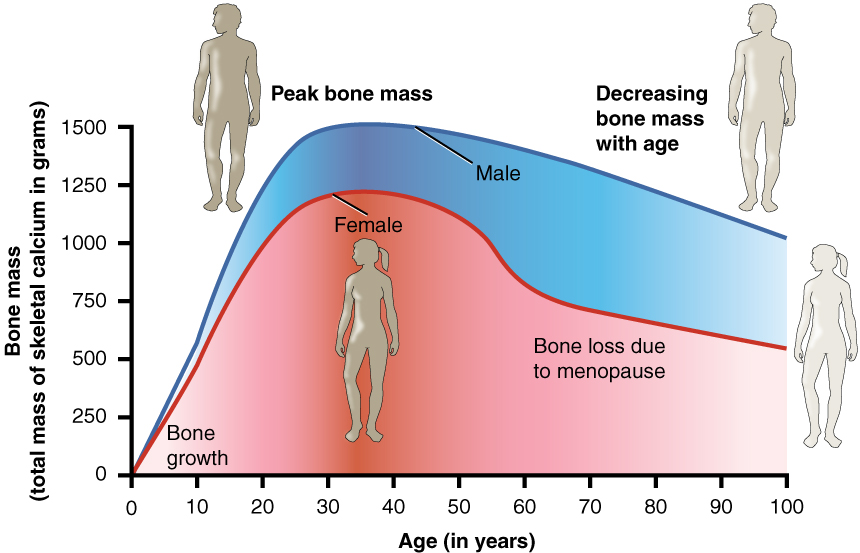
Bone loss due to menopause occurs due to changes in a woman's hormone levels.

The menopausal transition, and postmenopause itself, is a natural change, not usually a disease state or a disorder. The main cause of this transition is the natural depletion and aging of the finite amount of oocytes (ovarian reserve). This process is sometimes accelerated by other conditions and is known to occur earlier after a wide range of gynecologic procedures such as hysterectomy (with and without ovariectomy), endometrial ablation and uterine artery embolisation. The depletion of the ovarian reserve causes an increase in circulating follicle-stimulating hormone (FSH) and luteinizing hormone (LH) levels because there are fewer oocytes and follicles responding to these hormones and producing estrogen.

The transition has a variable degree of effects. The stages of the menopause transition have been classified according to a woman's reported bleeding pattern, supported by changes in the pituitary follicle-stimulating hormone (FSH) levels.

In younger women, during a normal menstrual cycle the ovaries produce estradiol, testosterone and progesterone in a cyclical pattern under the control of FSH and luteinizing hormone, which are both produced by the pituitary gland. During perimenopause (approaching menopause), estradiol levels and patterns of production remain relatively unchanged or may increase compared to young women, but the cycles become frequently shorter or irregular. The often observed increase in estrogen is presumed to be in response to elevated FSH levels that, in turn, is hypothesized to be caused by decreased feedback by inhibin. Similarly, decreased inhibin feedback after hysterectomy is hypothesized to contribute to increased ovarian stimulation and earlier menopause.

The menopausal transition is characterized by marked, and often dramatic, variations in FSH and estradiol levels. Because of this, measurements of these hormones are not considered to be reliable guides to a woman's exact menopausal status. Menopause occurs because of the sharp decrease of estradiol and progesterone production by the ovaries. After menopause, estrogen continues to be produced mostly by aromatase in fat tissues and is produced in small amounts in many other tissues such as ovaries, bone, blood vessels and the brain where it acts locally. The substantial fall in circulating estradiol levels at menopause impacts many tissues, from brain to skin.

In contrast to the sudden fall in estradiol during menopause, the levels of total and free testosterone, as well as dehydroepiandrosterone sulfate (DHEAS) and androstenedione appear to decline more or less steadily with age. An effect of natural menopause on circulating androgen levels has not been observed. Thus specific tissue effects of natural menopause cannot be attributed to loss of androgenic hormone production.

Hot flashes and other vasomotor and body symptoms accompanying the menopausal transition are associated with estrogen insufficiency and changes that occur in the brain, primarily the hypothalamus and involve complex interplay between the neurotransmitters kisspeptin, neurokinin B and dynorphin, which are found in KNDy neurons in the infundibular nucleus.

=== Ovarian aging ===
Decreased inhibin feedback after hysterectomy is hypothesized to contribute to increased ovarian stimulation and earlier menopause. Hastened ovarian aging has been observed after endometrial ablation. While it is difficult to prove that these surgeries are causative, it has been hypothesized that the endometrium may be producing endocrine factors contributing to the endocrine feedback and regulation of the ovarian stimulation. Elimination of these factors contributes to faster depletion of the ovarian reserve. Reduced blood supply to the ovaries that may occur as a consequence of hysterectomy and uterine artery embolisation has been hypothesized to contribute to this effect.

Impaired DNA repair mechanisms may contribute to earlier depletion of the ovarian reserve during aging. As women age, double-strand breaks accumulate in the DNA of their primordial follicles. Primordial follicles are immature primary oocytes surrounded by a single layer of granulosa cells. An enzyme system is present in oocytes that ordinarily accurately repairs DNA double-strand breaks. This repair system is called "homologous recombinational repair", and it is especially effective during meiosis. Meiosis is the general process by which germ cells are formed in all sexual eukaryotes; it appears to be an adaptation for efficiently removing damages in germ line DNA.

Human primary oocytes are present at an intermediate stage of meiosis, termed prophase I (see Oogenesis). Expression of four key DNA repair genes that are necessary for homologous recombinational repair during meiosis (BRCA1, MRE11, Rad51 and ATM) decline with age in oocytes. This age-related decline in ability to repair DNA double-strand damages can account for the accumulation of these damages, that then likely contributes to the depletion of the ovarian reserve.

== Diagnosis ==
Ways of assessing the impact on women of some of these menopause effects, include the Greene climacteric scale questionnaire, the Cervantes scale and the Menopause rating scale.

While these clinical tools quantify symptom severity, objective diagnosis relies on a combination of menstrual history and can be bolstered by laboratory bloodwork. Testing follicle-stimulating hormone (FSH) and estradiol levels can help map ovarian reserve, though these metrics often fluctuate erratically during perimenopause, making clinical symptom tracking the gold standard for diagnosis. Furthermore, laboratory panels are essential to rule out thyroid dysfunction, which can often mimic menopausal symptoms.

Recognising the full spectrum of perimenopause and menopause symptoms is critical for timely intervention and implementation of management strategies, spanning a broad continuum from lifestyle modifications and targeted non-hormonal therapies, to systemic Hormone Replacement Therapy (HRT), which addresses the root hormonal deficit to alleviate both physical and cognitive symptoms.

Beyond classic vasomotor events like hot flashes and night sweats, the systemic drop in estrogen during perimenopause or menopause can trigger lesser-known physical symptoms, including widespread joint paint due to increased inflammation and heightened histamine responses that manifest as new or worsening allergies. Estrogen deficiency is linked to cartilage degradation, structural changes, and the doubling of osteoarthritis risk and joint pain in postmenopausal women.

=== Perimenopause ===
The term "perimenopause", which literally means "around the menopause", refers to the menopause transition years before the date of the final episode of flow. According to the North American Menopause Society, this transition can last for four to eight years. The Centre for Menstrual Cycle and Ovulation Research describes it as a six-to-ten-year phase ending 12 months after the last menstrual period.

During perimenopause, estrogen levels average about 20–30% higher than during premenopause, often with wide fluctuations. These fluctuations cause many of the physical changes during perimenopause as well as menopause, especially during the last 1–2 years of perimenopause (before menopause). Some of these changes are hot flashes, night sweats, difficulty sleeping, mood swings, vaginal dryness or atrophy, incontinence, osteoporosis and heart disease. Perimenopause is also associated with a higher likelihood of depression, which is twice as likely to affect those with a history of depression.

During this period, fertility diminishes but is not considered to reach zero until the official date of menopause. The official date is determined retroactively, once 12 months have passed after the last appearance of menstrual blood. The menopause transition typically begins between 40 and 50 years of age (average 47.5). The duration of perimenopause may be for up to eight years. Women will often, but not always, start these transitions (perimenopause and menopause) about the same time as their mother did.

In 2025, the U.S. Department of Health and Human Services removed FDA warning labels from Hormone Replacement Therapy (HRT) products, expanding viable treatment possibilities for women in perimenopause and menopause; the change was made because the department alleged that they were misleading.

=== Postmenopause ===
The term "postmenopausal" describes women who have not experienced any menstrual flow for a minimum of 12 months, assuming that they have a uterus and are not pregnant or lactating. The reason for this delay in declaring postmenopause is that periods are usually erratic during menopause. Therefore, a reasonably long stretch of time is necessary to be sure that the cycling has ceased. At this point a woman is considered infertile; however, the possibility of becoming pregnant has usually been very low (but not quite zero) for a number of years before this point is reached.

In women with or without a uterus, menopause or postmenopause can also be identified by a blood test showing a very high follicle-stimulating hormone level, greater than 25 IU/L in a random blood draw; it rises as ovaries become inactive. FSH continues to rise, as its counterpart estradiol continues to drop for about 2 years after the last menstrual period, after which the levels of each of these hormones stabilize. The stabilisation period after the beginning of early postmenopause has been estimated to last 3 to 6 years, so early postmenopause lasts altogether about 5 to 8 years, during which hormone withdrawal effects such as hot flashes disappear. Finally, late postmenopause, formally categorized as Stage +2 by the gold-standard Stages of Reproductive Aging Workshop (STRAW +10) criteria, has been defined as the remainder of a woman's lifespan, when reproductive hormones stabilize and do not change any more.

A period-like flow during postmenopause, even spotting, may be a sign of endometrial cancer.

== Management ==
Perimenopause and menopause are natural stages of life with hormonal changes that can impact well being and cause symptoms ranging in severity from person to person. It is not a disease or a disorder, so it does not automatically require any kind of medical treatment. However, in those cases where the physical, mental and emotional effects and symptoms of perimenopause and menopause significantly disrupt the life of the woman experiencing them, palliative medical therapy may sometimes be appropriate.

=== Menopausal hormone therapy (MHT) ===
In the context of the menopause, menopausal hormone therapy (MHT) is the use of estrogen in women without a uterus and estrogen plus progestogen in women who have an intact uterus. MHT may be reasonable for the treatment of menopausal symptoms, such as hot flashes. It is the most effective treatment option, especially when delivered as a skin patch. Outdated research cited the use of MHT appeared to increase the risk of strokes and blood clots, but the FDA removed broad "black box" warnings related to this misinformation from most MHT products in February of 2026. When used for menopausal symptoms the global recommendation is MHT should be prescribed for as long as there are defined treatment effects and goals for the individual woman. MHT is also effective for preventing bone loss and osteoporotic fracture, but it is generally recommended only for women at significant risk for whom other therapies are unsuitable. MHT may be unsuitable for some women, including those at increased risk of cardiovascular disease, increased risk of thromboembolic disease (such as those with obesity or a history of venous thrombosis) or increased risk of some types of cancer. There is some concern that this treatment may increase the risk of breast cancer. Women at increased risk of cardiometabolic disease and VTE may be able to use transdermal estradiol which does not appear to increase risks in low to moderate doses. Adding testosterone to hormone therapy has a positive effect on sexual function in postmenopausal women, although it may be accompanied by hair growth or acne if used in excess. Transdermal testosterone therapy in appropriate dosing is generally safe. In addition to patches, MHT is also available in the form of pills and topical creams, all of which are increasingly popular for women in both perimenopause and menopause.

=== Selective estrogen receptor modulators ===
SERMs are a category of drugs, either synthetically produced or derived from a botanical source, that act selectively as agonists or antagonists on the estrogen receptors throughout the body. The most commonly prescribed SERMs are raloxifene and tamoxifen. Raloxifene exhibits oestrogen agonist activity on bone and lipids, and antagonist activity on breast and the endometrium. Tamoxifen is in widespread use for treatment of hormone sensitive breast cancer. Raloxifene prevents vertebral fractures in postmenopausal, osteoporotic women and reduces the risk of invasive breast cancer.

=== Other medications ===
Some of the SSRIs and SNRIs appear to provide some relief from vasomotor symptoms. The most effective SSRIs and SNRIs are paroxetine, escitalopram, citalopram, venlafaxine and desvenlafaxine. They may, however, be associated with appetite and sleeping problems, constipation and nausea.

Gabapentin or fezolinetant can also improve the frequency and severity of vasomotor symptoms. Side effects of using gabapentin include drowsiness and headaches.

=== Therapy ===
In 2026, the North American Menopause Society highly recommends Cognitive Behavioral Therapy (CBT) for managing the psychological and physical effects of menopause. CBT can provide practical skills to reduce mood disturbances, anxiety and sleep issues. CBT can also help women with processing the changes occurring to their bodies and personalities during perimenopause and menopause. Additionally, cognitive behavioural therapy and clinical hypnosis may decrease the amount women are affected by hot flashes.

=== Lifestyle and exercise ===
Exercise has been thought to reduce postmenopausal symptoms through the increase of endorphin levels, which decrease as estrogen production decreases. However, there is insufficient evidence to suggest that exercise helps with the symptoms of menopause. A high BMI can be a risk factor for vasomotor symptoms in particular, so weight loss may help with symptom management.

Women should evaluate what cooling techniques, such as using specific clothing or environment control tools (for example fans), might help with symptoms. Paced breathing and relaxation methods could also be effective in easing symptoms.

Research suggests that, as hormones and gut microbiome are intertwined in some ways, hormone fluctuations during menopause can alter the gut environment and microbial activity. This can contribute to menopausal symptoms, including weight gain and mood swings. Diet can support a healthy gut microbiome, and avoiding things like alcohol and added sugar, which can disrupt this environment, could mitigate symptoms.

=== Dietary supplements ===
There is not enough research or evidence of consistent benefit of taking any dietary supplements or herbal products for menopausal symptoms. That being said, every woman's body is different and many women in perimenopause and menopause have been given medical advice to try OTC dietary supplements to ease symptoms. Some of the supplements often recommended by doctors are:

- Vitamin D & Calcium: Crucial to maintaining bone density, which can begin to decline in perimenopause. Vitamin D can also help with immunities and mood.
- B-Complex: B vitamins (especially B6) can boost energy and cognitive function, and ease irritability.
- Black Cohosh: Popular for hot flash relief, though scientific evidence on effectiveness and long-term safety is mixed.
- Glucosamine/Chondroitin: This evidence-backed supplement is made of naturally occurring components of cartilage. Supplementation can slow cartilage breakdown and help manage osteoarthritis discomfort.
- Flaxseed: Rich in omega-3 fatty acids and lignans, which can help manage hormone levels and decrease the severity of night sweats.
- Maca Root: Popular, non-hormonal adaptogen used to help manage perimenopause and menopause symptoms. Works by supporting the endocrine and nervous systems to aid with hormone balance (without acting as a direct source of estrogen), energy and mood, and libido.

And others. Consult your physician for further recommendations and before starting on any supplementation.

=== Alternative medicine ===
There is no evidence of consistent benefit of alternative therapies for menopausal symptoms despite their popularity. A 2024 evidence map focused specifically on the genitourinary symptoms of menopause identified 57 randomized controlled trials of complementary and alternative therapies covering 39 different interventions, but found the studies too varied in their methods to allow conclusions about effectiveness. As of 2023, there is no evidence to support the efficacy of acupuncture as a management for menopausal symptoms. The Cochrane review found not enough evidence in 2016 to show a difference between Chinese herbal medicine and placebo for the vasomotor symptoms.

=== Other efforts ===
- Lack of lubrication is a common problem during and after perimenopause. Vaginal moisturizers can help women with overall dryness, and lubricants can help with lubrication difficulties that may be present during intercourse. It is worth pointing out that moisturizers and lubricants are different products for different issues: some women complain that their genitalia are uncomfortably dry all the time, and they may do better with moisturizers. Those who need only lubricants do well using them only during intercourse.
- Low-dose prescription vaginal estrogen products such as estrogen creams are generally a safe way to use estrogen topically, to help vaginal thinning and dryness problems (see vaginal atrophy) while only minimally increasing the levels of estrogen in the bloodstream.
- Individual counseling or support groups can sometimes be helpful to handle sad, depressed, anxious or confused feelings women may be having as they pass through what can be for some a very challenging transition time.
- Osteoporosis can be minimized by smoking cessation, adequate vitamin D intake and regular weight-bearing exercise. The bisphosphonate drug alendronate may decrease the risk of a fracture, in women that have both bone loss and a previous fracture and less so for those with just osteoporosis.
- A surgical procedure where a part of one of the ovaries is removed earlier in life and frozen and then over time thawed and returned to the body (ovarian tissue cryopreservation) has been tried. While at least 11 women have undergone the procedure and paid over £6,000, there is no evidence it is safe or effective.

== Society and culture ==
=== Attitudes and experiences ===
The menopause transition is a process, involving hormonal, menstrual, cognitive, structural and typically vasomotor changes. However, the experience of menopause as a whole is very much influenced by other factors, such as medical history, past experience, lifestyle, social and cultural meanings of menopause, and a woman's social and material circumstances. Menopause has been described as a biopsychosocial experience, with social and cultural factors playing a prominent role in the way menopause is experienced and perceived. This does not mean that the symptoms or effects of menopause are not real; they are directly caused by the changes occurring in the body during this phase of life.

The paradigm within which a woman considers menopause can influence the way she views it: women who understand menopause as a medical condition rate it significantly more negatively than those who view it as a life transition or a symbol of aging. There is some evidence that negative attitudes and expectations, held before menopause, predict symptom experience during the menopause, and beliefs and attitudes toward menopause tend to be more positive in postmenopausal than in premenopausal women. Women with more negative attitudes towards the menopause report more symptoms during this transition.

Though there has been a shift towards more public conversations around perimenopause and menopause, it is often still seen as a private women's health issue and is predominantly understood through the medical paradigm. Despite these growing conversations, the embodied experience of perimenopause and menopause is often reduced to biological symptoms rather than understood as a complex social and cultural process that is impacted by a range of factors, creating different experiences for each and every woman. Hot flashes are one of the most common symptoms of menopause, and information about menopause can seem reductive in the tremendous focus on this symptom. That being said, hot flashes are known to cause psychological symptoms such as anxiety and embarrassment for some women.

Heat and emotionality are frequently linked, which can socially associate hot flashes with a breakdown of emotional and physical regulation. This can be partially understood as hot flashes breaking down barriers between private, internal bodily processes and the external world, physically manifesting menopause. Observers of menopause have sometimes interpreted it as a complete loss of the ability to regulate emotions, an interpretation frequently at odds with how it is actually experienced by the individual.

Victorian medical understandings—which positioned women's health as primarily controlled by the reproductive system—could have influenced ideas around hot flashes as revealing the dominance of reproductive control over the individual. Feminist critiques of medical treatment of menopause, however, have framed it as part of a broader social and political system "that attempts to control the effects of the aging of the female body, which loses its social significance with the loss of reproductive capacity". This tension between medicalisation and feminist perspectives highlights how menopause has been framed less as a natural life stage and more as a site of social regulation and control.

Menopause is a stage of life experienced in different ways. It can be characterized by personal challenges, changes in personal roles within the family and society. Women's approaches to changes during menopause are influenced by their personal, family and sociocultural background. Women from different regions and countries also have different attitudes. Postmenopausal women had more positive attitudes toward menopause compared with peri- or premenopausal women. Other influencing factors of attitudes toward menopause include age, menopausal symptoms, psychological and socioeconomical status, and profession and ethnicity.

Ethnicity and geography play roles in the experience of menopause. American women of different ethnicities report significantly different types of menopausal effects. One major study found Caucasian women most likely to report what are sometimes described as psychosomatic symptoms, while African-American women were more likely to report vasomotor symptoms.

There may be variations in experiences of women from different ethnic backgrounds regarding menopause and care. Immigrant women reported more vasomotor symptoms and other physical symptoms and poorer mental health than non-immigrant women and were mostly dissatisfied with the care they had received. Self-management strategies for menopausal symptoms were also influenced by culture.

Two multinational studies of Asian women, found that hot flushes were not the most commonly reported symptoms, instead body and joint aches, memory problems, sleeplessness, irritability and migraines were. In another study comparing experiences of menopause amongst White Australian women and women in Laos, Australian women reported higher rates of depression, as well as fears of aging, weight gain and cancer—fears not reported by Laotian women, who positioned menopause as a positive event. Japanese women experience menopause effects, or kōnenki (更年期), in a different way from American women. Japanese women report lower rates of hot flashes and night sweats; this can be attributed to a variety of factors, both biological and social. Historically, kōnenki was associated with wealthy middle-class housewives in Japan, i.e., it was a "luxury disease" that women from traditional, inter-generational rural households did not report. Menopause in Japan was viewed as a symptom of the inevitable process of aging, rather than a "revolutionary transition", or a "deficiency disease" in need of management.

As of 2005, in Japanese culture, reporting of vasomotor symptoms has been on the increase, with research finding that of 140 Japanese participants, hot flashes were prevalent in 22.1%. This was almost double that of 20 years prior. Whilst the exact cause for this is unknown, possible contributing factors include dietary changes, increased medicalisation of middle-aged women and increased media attention on the subject. However, reporting of vasomotor symptoms is still "significantly" lower than in North America.

Additionally, while most women in the United States apparently have a negative view of menopause as a time of deterioration or decline, some studies seem to indicate that women from some Asian cultures have an understanding of menopause that focuses on a sense of liberation and celebrates the freedom from the risk of pregnancy. Diverging from these conclusions, one study appeared to show that many American women "experience this time as one of liberation and self-actualization".

Recent biosocial and anthropological scholarship cautions against interpreting ethnic or national differences in menopausal timing and symptom burden as innate racial biology. A 2024 U.S. scoping review synthesising fifteen studies reported that African American women, on average, reach natural menopause earlier than White women and report vasomotor symptoms more frequently. The review links these patterns to cumulative psychosocial stressors—including racial discrimination, lower income and heavy caregiving demands—rather than to genetic difference. It also reports associations between intimate partner violence and childhood abuse with greater symptom severity, as well as higher hormone therapy use among women veterans, patterns interpreted as markers of heightened chronic stress exposure. These findings highlight how experiences of inequality and trauma can become biologically embedded, shaping health outcomes across the life course. Anthropological syntheses likewise emphasize "local biologies," showing that symptom profiles vary across societies as labor rhythms, diet, clinical discourse and life-course endocrinology interact. For example, Japanese women commonly report chilliness rather than hot flushes, and symptom labeling and expectations differ accordingly. This underscores that menopause is not only a physiological transition but also a socially mediated experience that reflects broader cultural environments. Together, these sources suggest that apparent disparities are best understood as embodied effects of unequal social conditions and culturally specific meanings. Explanations focused only on attitudes or estrogen may overlook wider social determinants and limit clinical care.

In some women, menopause may bring about a sense of loss related to the end of fertility. In addition, this change often aligns with other stressors, such as the responsibility of looking after elderly parents or dealing with the emotional challenges of "empty nest syndrome" when children move out of the family home. This situation can be accentuated in cultures where being older is negatively perceived.

=== LGBTQ+ experiences ===
The experience of menopause for non-binary and transgender people can be especially difficult in relation to gender, as menopause is heavily defined as a feminine experience. Menopause is typically defined as the discontinuation of menstrual periods, the conclusion of fertility, and the finalisation of ovarian function—all of which are deeply connected to traditional understandings of gender and femininity. One study, published in the International Journal of Transgender Health, reported that non-binary individuals experienced menopause as having an impact on their gender identity, either positively or negatively, and that many also struggled to find supportive resources and spaces to share their experiences.

Some participants further highlighted broader societal prejudices that undermined their sense of security—especially as menopause is still largely framed through traditional ideas of gender, hormones and the female body. They also emphasised that many medical professionals lacked adequate understanding of menopause in relation to non-binary and transgender people. This lack of awareness often created barriers to accessing essential health services that recognised and met their needs. A 2021 UK GP Patient Survey found that while trans and non‑binary adults reported similar access to primary care as the general population, they were significantly less likely to feel involved in decisions about their treatment (85.0% versus 93.7%) and less likely to feel their needs were met overall (88.1% versus 95.2%).

=== Menopause across cultures ===
Menopause is both viewed and experienced differently in cultures around the globe. From a Western perspective, focus on menopause tends to be more scientific, with an emphasis on the management of symptoms.

In post-war (modern) Japan, there has been a sharp increase in the medicalisation of menopause. Anthropologist Margaret Lock explores the cultural construction of the 'menopausal syndrome' present in Japanese rhetoric. Whilst symptoms of 'headaches, shoulder stiffness and dizziness' are viewed as usual menopause symptoms, 'changes in endocrine function and in the autonomic nervous system' are classified as menopausal. The menopausal syndrome is perpetrated as being more common in housewives. This is because as they age, "their traditional role [as a housewife] is in jeopardy", creating larger susceptibility to stress. Menopausal syndrome is highly stigmatised and associated with being selfish, pleasure driven and deficient in willpower. However, there is a significant difference between the rhetoric and statistical results. Lock reports that housewives do not experience higher menopausal symptoms. In her sample, 53% of women reported going through menopause, yet only 12% reported visiting the gynaecologist in the past two years, and only 2% had taken prescribed estrogen replacement therapy. A curation of the societal role of women, increasing medicalisation, economic concern and the 'usefulness' of middle-aged women has led to this increasing debate over menopause in Japan. However, while both symptoms and rhetoric grow, so does the 'political consciousness' of Japanese middle-aged women.

Throughout Mayan history, the cultural perception of menopause is primarily understood as a biological transitioning, rather than bearing any medical or societal significance. An article written by Yewoubdar Beyen delves into the experiences of menopause by Mayan women in Yucatán. Discoveries made by this study promote the cultural construction of menopause as "unmarked" by stigma, rituals or significance. The emphasis of menopause in Western societies differentiated from the Mayan perception, where it is beheld as a natural part of development, holding no substantiating symbolic importance. Beyen found that 68.2% of Mayan women reported no distressing health changes, which may suggest that the absence of medicalisation leads to a reduction of symptom reporting. Similar results were evident in Donna Stewart's investigation on Highland Guatemalan Mayan women who welcomed their symptoms and perceived them positively. Some Mayan women express a sense of liberation after menopause; free from menstruation and childbearing. Cross-cultural research affirms this, discovering that feelings around menopause varies through cultural interpretation. The absence of negative cultural connotations enables Mayan women for a more normalised transition to an older stage of life. Collectively, these discoveries challenge the Western model of menopause by exploring how neutral cultural beliefs shape experiences of menopause.

A study conducted at Monash University saw 74% of post-menopausal Australian women under the age of 55 suffer from vasomotor symptoms, with 28% reporting them as "severely bothersome". It is statistics like this which have promoted the use of Hormone Replacement Therapy (HRT), also known as Menopausal Hormone Therapy (MHT) in Australia. These ongoing studies have proven that for symptomatic women, non-hormonal remedies are significantly "less effective than MHT". This in turn has opened the floor for conversations surrounding menopause and its various symptoms, leading to further education for health professionals and women alike, through public health campaigns promoting evidence-based education.

Along with menopausal education in Australia, the importance of biocultural research in this area is being explored. An examination conducted by a team of female anthropologists at BMC Women's Health denotes that there is extensive research for Australian women as a collective while only two reports relating to the Indigenous population. Through this the anthropological team highlight the importance of understanding "culture, social disadvantage" and suggest that this would aid the population and improve "management and support for Indigenous Australian women".

=== Impact on work ===
Midlife is typically a life stage when men and women may be dealing with demanding life events and responsibilities, such as work, health problems and caring roles. For example, in 2018 in the UK women aged 45–54 report more work-related stress than men or women of any other age group. Hot flashes are often reported to be particularly distressing at work and lead to embarrassment and worry about potential stigmatisation. A June 2023 study by the Mayo Clinic estimated an annual loss of $1.8 billion in the United States due to workdays missed as a result of menopause symptoms. This was one of the largest studies to date examining the impact of menopause symptoms on work outcomes. The research concluded there was a strong need to improve medical treatment for menopausal women and make the workplace environment more supportive to avoid such productivity losses.

=== Etymology ===
Menopause literally means the "end of monthly cycles" (the end of monthly periods or menstruation), from the Greek word pausis ("pause") and mēn ("month"). This is a medical coinage; the Greek word for menses is actually different. In Ancient Greek, the menses were described in the plural, ta emmēnia ("the monthlies"), and its modern descendant has been clipped to ta emmēna. The Modern Greek medical term is emmenopausis in Katharevousa or emmenopausi in Demotic Greek. The Ancient Greeks did not produce medical concepts about any symptoms associated with end of menstruation and did not use a specific word to refer to this time of a woman's life. The word menopause was invented by French doctors at the beginning of the nineteenth century. Greek etymology was reconstructed at this time and it was the Parisian student doctor Charles-Pierre-Louis de Gardanne who invented a variation of the word in 1812, which was edited to its final French form in 1821.

Some of them noted that peasant women had no complaints about the end of menses, while urban middle-class women had many troubling symptoms. Doctors at this time considered the symptoms to be the result of urban lifestyles of sedentary behaviour, alcohol consumption, too much time indoors and over-eating, with a lack of fresh fruit and vegetables.

The word "menopause" was coined specifically for female humans, where the end of fertility is traditionally indicated by the permanent stopping of monthly menstruations. However, menopause exists in some other animals, many of which do not have monthly menstruation; in this case, the term means a natural end to fertility that occurs before the end of the natural lifespan.

=== In popular culture, law and politics ===
In the 21st century, celebrities have spoken out about their experiences of the menopause, which has led to it becoming less of a taboo as it has boosted awareness of the debilitating symptoms. Subsequently, TV shows have been running features on the menopause to help women experiencing symptoms. In the UK Lorraine Kelly has been an advocate for getting women to speak about their experiences including sharing her own. This has led to an increase in women seeking treatment such as HRT. Davina McCall also led an awareness campaign based on a documentary on Channel 4.

In the UK, Carolyn Harris sponsored the Menopause (Support and Services) Bill in June 2021. It was to exempt hormone replacement therapy from National Health Service prescription charges and to make provisions about menopause support and services, including public education and communication in supporting perimenopausal and post-menopausal women, and to raise awareness of menopause and its effects. The bill was withdrawn on 29 October 2021.

In the US, David McKinley, Republican from West Virginia introduced the Menopause Research Act in September 2022 for $100 million in 2023 and 2024, but it stalled.

== Other animals ==
The majority of mammal species reach menopause when they cease the production of ovarian follicles, which contain eggs (oocytes), between one-third and two-thirds of their maximum possible lifespan. However, few live long enough in the wild to reach this point. Humans are joined by a limited number of other species in which females live substantially longer than their ability to reproduce. Examples of others include cetaceans: beluga whales, narwhals, orcas, false killer whales and short-finned pilot whales. Research published in 2023 and 2025 showed that wild Ugandan chimpanzees and gorillas, respectively, undergo menopause.

Menopause has been reported in a variety of other vertebrate species, but these examples tend to be from captive individuals, and thus are not necessarily representative of what happens in natural populations in the wild. Menopause in captivity has been observed in several species of nonhuman primates, including rhesus macaques and chimpanzees. Some research suggests that wild chimpanzees do not experience menopause, as their fertility declines are associated with declines in overall health. Menopause has been reported in elephants in captivity and guppies. Dogs do not experience menopause; the canine estrus cycle simply becomes irregular and infrequent. Although older female dogs are not considered good candidates for breeding, offspring have been produced by older animals, see Canine reproduction. Similar observations have been made in cats.

Life histories show a varying degree of senescence; rapid senescing organisms (e.g., Pacific salmon and annual plants) do not have a post-reproductive life-stage. Gradual senescence is exhibited by all placental mammalian life histories.

== Evolution ==
There are various theories on the origin and process of the evolution of the menopause. These attempt to suggest evolutionary benefits to the human species stemming from the cessation of women's reproductive capability before the end of their natural lifespan. It is conjectured that in highly social groups natural selection favors females that stop reproducing and devote that post-reproductive life span to continuing to care for existing offspring, both their own and those of others to whom they are related, especially their granddaughters and grandsons.

== See also ==
- European Menopause and Andropause Society
- Menopause in the workplace
- Menopause in incarceration
- Advanced maternal age
- Age and female fertility
- Evolution of menopause
- Menarche – the equivalent opposite change at the beginning of the child-bearing years

== Sources ==
- Martin E (2001). The Woman in the Body: A Cultural Analysis of Reproduction. Beacon Press. ISBN 978-0-8070-4645-6.
