= Index of biochemistry articles =

Biochemistry is the study of the chemical processes in living organisms. It deals with the structure and function of cellular components such as proteins, carbohydrates, lipids, nucleic acids and other biomolecules.

Articles related to biochemistry include:

== 0–9 ==
2-amino-5-phosphonovalerate - 3' end - 5' end

== A ==
ABC-Transporter Genes - abl gene - acetic acid - acetyl CoA - acetylcholine - acetylcysteine - acid - acidic fibroblast growth factor - acrosin - actin - action potential - activation energy - active site - active transport - adenosine - adenosine diphosphate (ADP) - adenosine monophosphate (AMP) - adenosine triphosphate (ATP) - adenovirus - adrenergic receptor - adrenodoxin - aequorin - aerobic respiration - agonist - alanine - albumin - alcohol - alcoholic fermentation - alicyclic compound - aliphatic compound - alkali - allosteric site - allostery - allotrope - allotropy - alpha adrenergic receptor - alpha helix - alpha-1 adrenergic receptor - alpha-2 adrenergic receptor - alpha-beta T-cell antigen receptor - alpha-fetoprotein - alpha-globulin - alpha-macroglobulin - alpha-MSH - Ames test - amide - amine - amino - amino acid - amino acid receptor - amino acid sequence - amino acid sequence homology - aminobutyric acid - ammonia - AMPA receptor - amyloid - anabolism - anaerobic respiration - analytical chemistry - androgen receptor - angiotensin - angiotensin II - angiotensin receptor - ankyrin - annexin II - antibiotic - antibody - apoenzyme - apolipoprotein - apoptosis - aquaporin - archaea - arginine - argipressin - aromatic amine - aromatic compound - arrestin - Arrhenius equation - aryl hydrocarbon receptor - asparagine - aspartic acid - atom - atomic absorption spectroscopy - atomic mass - atomic nucleus - atomic number - atomic orbital - atomic radius - Atomic weight - ATP synthase - ATPase - atrial natriuretic factor - atrial natriuretic factor receptor - Avogadro constant - axon

== B ==
B cell - bacteria - bacterial conjugation - bacterial outer membrane protein - bacterial protein - bacteriorhodopsin - base (chemistry) - base pair - base sequence - basic fibroblast growth factor - Bcl-2 - bcr-abl fusion protein - benzene - benzene ring - beta-2 microglobulin - beta adrenergic receptor - beta sheet - beta-1 adrenergic receptor - beta-2 adrenergic receptor - beta-thromboglobulin - bioaccumulation - biochemistry - biodiversity - bioethics - biogenic amine receptor - bioinformatics - biological membrane - biologist - biology - biomechanics - biomedical model - biomolecule - biophysics - biopolymer - biosalinity - biotechnology - BLAST - blood proteins - boiling point - Boltzmann distribution - Boltzmann principle - bombesin - bombesin receptor - bone morphogenetic protein - bradykinin - bradykinin receptor - BRCA1 - buffer solution

== C ==
C-terminus - C4 photosynthesis - cadherin - calbindin -calcitonin - calcitonin gene-related peptide - calcitonin gene-related peptide receptor - calcitonin receptor - calcitriol receptor - calcium channel - calcium signaling - calcium-binding protein - calmodulin - calmodulin-binding protein - Calvin cycle - CAM photosynthesis - CAM plants - cancer - capsid - carbohydrate - carbon - carbon fixation - carboxylic acid - carcinoembryonic antigen - carrier - carrier protein - CAS registry number - casein - catabolism - catalyst - catalytic domain - CCR5 receptor - CD4 antigen - CD45 antigen - CD95 antigen - CDC28 protein kinase - cell - cell adhesion molecule - cell biology - cell cycle protein - cell membrane - cell membrane transport - cell nucleus - cell surface receptor - cellular respiration - cellulose - centriole - centromere - centrosome - chaperone - chelation - chemical biology - chemical bond - chemical compound - conformation - chemical element - chemical equilibrium - chemical formula - chemical nomenclature - chemical property - chemical reaction - chemical series - chemical thermodynamics - cheminformatics - chemiosmosis - chemiosmotic hypothesis - chemiosmotic potential - chemist - chemistry - chemistry basic topics - chemotroph - chemokine receptor - chemoreceptor - chiasma - chimera (protein) - chimeric protein - chirality - chloride channel - chlorophyll - chloroplast - chloroplast membrane - cholecystokinin receptor - cholesterine - cholinergic receptor - chorionic gonadotropin - chromatid - chromatin - ciclosporin - chromatography - chromosomal crossover - chromosome - chromosome walking - cilium - circular dichroism - cis face - citric acid - citric acid cycle - cladistics - cloning - coenzyme - cofactor (biochemistry) - colchicine - collagen - colloid - colony-stimulating factor - colony stimulating factor 1 receptor - colorimeter - comparative biochemistry - competitive inhibition - complement 3A - complement 5A - complement factor B - complement membrane attack complex - complement receptor - complex - computational biology - computational chemistry - computational genomics - concanavalin A - concentration - concentration gradient - consensus sequence - conserved sequence - cooperative - cooperative binding - cooperativity - cooperativity cellular respiration - corticotropin - corticotropin receptor - corticotropin-releasing hormone - corticotropin-releasing hormone receptor - cotransport metabolism - covalent bond - covalent radius - CpG island - cristae - cryptobiology - crystal structure - crystallography - cuticula - CXCR4 receptor - cyclic AMP receptor - cyclic AMP receptor protein - cyclic AMP-responsive DNA-binding protein - cyclic electron flow - cyclic nucleotide - cyclic peptide - cyclin - cyclin A - cyclin B - cyclin E - cyclin-dependent kinase - cycloleucine - cyclosporin - cyclosporine - cystatin - cysteine - cystic fibrosis transmembrane conductance regulator - cytochrome B - cytochrome C - cytochrome P-450 - cytochrome P-450 CYP1A1 - cytochrome C oxidase - cytokine receptor - cytoplasm - cytoplasmic and nuclear receptor - cytosine - cytoskeletal protein - cytoskeleton - cytosol - cytotoxic T cell

== D ==
dactinomycin - dalton - decarboxylation reaction - delta opioid receptor - denaturation (biochemistry) - dendrite - dendritic cell - dendritic spine - deoxyribonucleoprotein - deoxyribose - desmopressin - deuterium - developmental biology - dialysis (chemical) - diffusion - dimer - dinucleotide repeat - diploid - disaccharide - dissociation constant - disulfide bond - disulfide bridge - DNA - DNA fragmentation - DNA replication - DNA sequence - DNA topology - DNA transposable element - DNA virus - DNA-binding protein - dopamine D1 receptor - dopamine D2 receptor - dopamine receptor - double helix - Drosophila - drugs - dynorphin

== E ==
eIF-2 - eIF-2 kinase - electrochemical potential - electron - electron capture - electron configuration - electron microscopy - electron shell - electron transport chain - electron volt - electronegativity - electrophile - electrophoresis - electrophysiology - element - element symbol - ELISA - ELISPOT - embryo - embryonal development - emulsion - endergonic reaction - endodermis - endomembrane system - endoplasmic reticulum - endothelin receptor - endothelin-1 - energy decomposition cycles - energy level - enhancer - enkephalin - enthalpy - entomology - entropy - env gene product - environmental chemistry - enzyme - epidermal growth factor - epidermal growth factor receptor - epidiorite - epigenetics - epinephrine - equine gonadotropin - erbA gene - erbB gene - erbB-2 gene - erbB-2 receptor - erythropoietin - erythropoietin receptor - essential amino acid - ester - estradiol receptor - estrogen receptor - ethanol - ether - eukaryote - evolution - evolutionary biology - evolutionary developmental biology - evolutionary tree - excretion - exergonic reaction - exon - extracellular matrix protein - eye proteins

== F ==
fab immunoglobulin - facilitated diffusion - factor VIII - FADH - FADH2 - Fat - Fatty acid - fc immunoglobulin - fc receptor - feedback inhibition - fermentation - fetal protein - fibroblast growth factor - fibroblast growth factor receptor - fibronectin - Fick's law of diffusion - Filtration - fitness (biology) - fitness landscape - flagellum - flavin adenine dinucleotide - flavine - flavoprotein - fluid mosaic model - fms gene - Formaldehyde - fos gene - free energy - freezing point - FSH receptor - functional group - fungal protein - fungi - fusion oncogene protein

== G ==
G protein - G protein-coupled receptor - G3P - GABA - GABA receptor - GABA-A receptor - gag-onc fusion protein - galanin - gamete - gamma-chain immunoglobulin - gamma-delta T-cell antigen receptor - gastrin - gastrointestinal hormone receptor - gastrula - gel electrophoresis - gene - gene expression - gene pool - gene regulatory network - genetic carrier - genetic code - genetic drift - genetic engineering - genetic fingerprint - genetic recombination - genetics - genome - genomics - genotype - glial fibrillary acidic protein - globin - glucagon - glucagon receptor - glucocorticoid receptor - glucose - glutamate - glutamate receptor - glutamic acid - glutamine - glycerine - glycine - glycine receptor - glycolipid - glycolysis - glycoprotein - gonadorelin - gradient - granulocyte colony-stimulating factor - granulocyte colony-stimulating factor receptor - granulocyte-macrophage colony-stimulating factor - granulocyte-macrophage colony-stimulating factor receptor - granzyme - growth factor receptor - GTP-binding protein - GTPase

== H ==
hair cell - half-life - halobacteria - halotolerance - haploid - heat of fusion - heat of vaporization - heat shock protein - Hsp70 (70 kDa heat shock proteins) - Hsp90 (90 kDa heat shock proteins) - heavy-chain immunoglobulin - Hela cell - helminth protein - helper T cell - hemopexin - hemoglobin - herpes simplex virus protein vmw65 - heterocyclic compound - heterotroph - heterozygote - Hfr cell - Hill reaction - His tag - histamine H1 receptor - histamine H2 receptor - histamine receptor - histidine - histone - history of science and technology - HIV receptor - holoenzyme - homeobox - homeodomain protein - homology - homoserine - homozygote - homunculus - hormone - housekeeping gene - Human Genome Project - hybridization - hydrocarbon - hydrogen - hydrogen bond - hydrogenation - hydrogen-deuterium exchange - hydrolysis - hydrolytic enzyme - hydrophilic - hydrophobe - hydrophobic - hydrophobicity analysis - hydroxyl

== I ==
IgA - IgE receptor - IGF type 1 receptor - IGF type 2 receptor - IgG - IgM - immediate-early protein - immune cell - immune system - immunoglobulin - immunoglobulin joining region - immunoglobulin variable region - immunologic receptor - immunology - In vivo - infrared spectroscopy - inhibin - inhibitor - inhibitory gi G-protein - Inorganic chemistry - insect protein - Insulin - insulin receptor - insulin-like growth factor I - Integral membrane protein - intein - intercellular adhesion molecule-1 - interferon receptor - interferon type I - interferon type II - interferon-alpha - interferon-beta - interleukin receptor - interleukin-1 receptor - interleukin-2 receptor - interleukin-3 - interleukin-3 receptor - intermediate filament - intermediate filament protein - intermembrane space - Intermolecular force - International Union of Pure and Applied Chemistry (IUPAC) - interphase - intracisternal A-particle gene - Intramolecular force - intron - Inverse agonist - invertebrate peptide receptor - invertebrate photoreceptor - Ion channel - ion channel gating - Ionic bond - ionization potential - iron–sulfur protein - isoenzyme - isoleucine - Isomer - Isothermal titration calorimeter - Isotopic tracer

== J ==
junk DNA

== K ==
kainic acid receptor - kallidin - kappa opioid receptor - kappa-chain immunoglobulin - karyoplasm - karyotype - kelvin - keratin - kinase - kinesin - kinetic energy - kinetic exclusion assay - kinetics - knock-out mouse - Krebs cycle

== L ==
lactalbumin - lactic acid - lactic acid autotroph - lactic fermentation - lagging strand - laminin - LDL receptor - Le Chatelier's principle - lectin - leucine - leucine-2-alanine enkephalin - leukotriene B4 receptor - LH - LH receptor - LHRH receptor - life - life form - ligand - light reactions - Lineweaver-Burk diagram - lipase - lipid - lipid anchored protein - lipid bilayer - lipoprotein - liquid - list of compounds - list of gene families - locus - luminescent protein - lymphocyte homing receptor - lysine - lysis - lysis buffer - lysozyme - lytic cycle

== M ==
macroevolution - macromolecular system - macromolecule - macrophage colony-stimulating factor - major histocompatibility complex - Malpighi body - Malpighi layer - marine biology - maslinic acid - mass spectrometer - maturation-promoting factor - mechanoreceptor - medicine - meiosis - melting point - membrane glycoprotein - membrane protein - membrane topology - membrane transport - memory B cell - memory T cell - Mendelian inheritance - metabolic pathway - metabolism - metabotropic glutamate receptor - metalloprotein - metaphase - metazoa - methionine - micelle - Michaelis-Menten kinetics - microbe - microbiology - microevolution - microfilament - microfilament protein - microsatellite - microscope - microtiter plate - microtubule-associated protein - mineralocorticoid receptor - minisatellite - mitochondrial membrane - mitochondrion - mitogen receptor - mitosis - mitotic spindle - mixture - modern evolutionary synthesis - molar volume - mole (unit) - molecular biology - molecular chaperone - molecular dynamics - molecular engineering - molecular evolution - molecular mechanics - molecular modelling - molecular orbital - molecular phylogeny - molecular sequence data - molecule - monoamine - monoclonal antibody - monomer - monosaccharide - monosaccharide transport protein - morphogenesis - morphogenetic field - mos gene - Mössbauer spectroscopy - MRI - MSH - mu opioid receptor - mu-chain immunoglobulin - mucin - Muller's ratchet - multiresistance - muscarinic receptor - muscle - muscle protein - mutagen - mutation - myc gene - mycology - myelin basic protein - myeloma protein - myosin

== N ==
N-formylmethionine - N-formylmethionine leucyl-phenylalanine - N-methyl-D-aspartate receptor - N-methylaspartate - N-terminus - NADH - NADPH - NaKATPase - native state - nef gene product - neoplasm protein - Nernst equation - nerve - nerve growth factor - nerve growth factor receptor - nerve tissue protein - nerve tissue protein S 100 - nervous system - neurobiology - neurofilament protein - neurokinin A - neurokinin K - neurokinin-1 receptor - neurokinin-2 receptor - neuron - neuronal cell adhesion molecule - neuropeptide - neuropeptide receptor - neuropeptide Y - neuropeptide Y receptor - neuroscience - neurotensin - neurotensin receptor - neurotransmitter - neurotransmitter receptor - neutral theory of molecular evolution - neutron - neutron activation analysis - NF-kappa B - nicotinic receptor - nitrogen - nitroglycerine - Nobel Prize in Chemistry - non-competitive inhibition - nuclear lamina - nuclear localization signal - nuclear magnetic resonance - NMR - nuclear protein - nucleic acid - nucleic acid regulatory sequence - nucleic acid repetitive sequence - nucleic acid sequence homology - nucleon - nucleophile - nucleoside - nucleosome - nucleotide - nutrition

== O ==
octreotide - odorant receptor - olfaction - olfactory receptor neuron - oligopeptide - oncogene - oncogene protein - oncogene proteins V-abl - oncogenic retroviridae protein - open reading frame - opioid receptor - opsin - optical isomerism - organ (anatomy) - organelle - organic chemistry - organic compound - organic nomenclature - organic reaction - organism - osmosis - osteocalcin - outer hair cell - outline of biochemical techniques - ovalbumin - oxidation - oxidation number - oxidation state - oxidative decarboxylation - oxidative phosphorylation - oxygen - oxytocin - oxytocin receptor

== P ==
P42 MAP kinase -p53 - pancreatic polypeptide - parathyroid hormone receptor - partial pressure - passive transport - Pauling scale - PCR - peptide - peptide bond - peptide elongation factor - peptide elongation factor tu - peptide fragment - peptide initiation factor - peptide receptor - peptide termination factor - peripheral membrane protein - pesticide - pH - phage display - pharmaceutical - pharmacist - pharmacology - phenol - phenotype - phenyl group - phenylalanine - Philadelphia chromosome - phospholipid - phospholipid bilayer - phosphopeptide - phosphoprotein - phosphorus - phosphorylation - phosphoserine - phosphothreonine - phosphotyrosine - photobiology - photolysis - photophosphorylation - photoreceptor - photorespiration - photosynthesis - photosystem I - photosystem II - phototransduction - phylogenetics - phylogeny - physical chemistry - physiology - phytohaemagglutinin - pituitary hormone receptor - pituitary hormone-regulating hormone receptor - plant protein - plasma membrane - plasmid - plasmin - plasminogen - platelet glycoprotein GPIb-IX complex - platelet membrane glycoprotein - platelet-derived growth factor - platelet-derived growth factor receptor - polymer - polymerase chain reaction - polymerization - polymyxin - polymyxin B - polyomavirus transforming antigen - polypeptide - polysaccharide - porphyrin - Posttranslational modification - potassium - potassium channel - potential energy - pregnancy proteins - primary nutritional groups - primary structure - primer - prion - progesterone receptor - prokaryote - prolactin - prolactin receptor - proline - promoter - prostaglandin e receptor - prostaglandin receptor - protein - protein biosynthesis - Protein Data Bank - protein design - protein expression - protein folding - protein isoform - protein nuclear magnetic resonance spectroscopy - protein P16 - protein P34cdc2 - protein precursor - protein structure prediction - protein subunit - protein synthesis - protein targeting - protein translocation - protein-tyrosine kinase - protein-tyrosine-phosphatase - proteinoid - proteomics - protirelin - proto-oncogene - proto-oncogene proteins - proto-oncogene protein C-kit - proto-oncogene proteins c-abl - proto-oncogene proteins c-bcl-2 - Proto-oncogene proteins c-fos - proto-oncogene proteins c-jun - proto-oncogene proteins c-mo - proto-oncogene proteins c-myc - proto-oncogene proteins c-raf - proton - proton pump - protozoan proteins - purine - purinergic P1 receptor - purinergic P2 receptor - purinergic receptor - pyridine - pyrimidine - pyruvate - pyruvate oxidation

== Q ==
quantum chemistry - quaternary structure

== R ==
radioisotope - radioisotopic labelling - Raman spectroscopy - random coil - Ras gene - Ras protein - reading frame - receptor (biochemistry) - receptor antagonist - receptor protein-tyrosine kinase - recombinant fusion protein - recombinant interferon-gamma - recombinant protein - recombination - redox - redox reaction - redox system - reflux - replication origin - replicon - repressor - repressor protein - respiration (physiology) - restriction enzyme - retinoblastoma protein - retinoic acid receptor - retinol-binding protein - retroelement - retroviridae protein - retrovirus - Reverse transcriptase - RFLP - rho factor - rhodopsin - ribonucleoprotein - ribose - ribosomal protein - ribosomal protein S6 kinase - ribosome - RNA - RNA virus - RNA-binding protein - RNA-directed DNA polymerase - rod outer segment - rough ER

== S ==
sarcoplasmic reticulum - satellite DNA - scientific notation - SDS-PAGE - second messenger - second messenger system - secondary structure - secretin - selectin - sensory receptor - sequence (biology) - sequence homology - sequence motif - sequencing - serine - serotonin - serotonin receptor - serpin - sexual reproduction - SH3 domain - SI - sigma factor - signal peptide - signal recognition particle - signal sequence - signal transduction - sincalide - skeleton - skin - smooth ER - sodium channel - sodium-hydrogen antiporter - soluble - solution - solvation - solvent - somatomedin - somatomedin receptor - somatostatin - somatostatin receptor - somatotropin - somatotropin receptor - somatotropin-releasing hormone - somatropin - sp1 transcription factor - spectrin - spectroscopy - src gene - src-family kinase - SSRI - starch - stem cell - stereochemistry - steroid 17alpha-monooxygenase - steroid 21-monooxygenase - steroid receptor - stimulatory gs G-protein - stoichiometry - structural biology - structural domain - Structural formula - structural motif - substance P - substrate - sugar - sulfur - supercoil - superfamily - superoxide - surface immunoglobulin - surface plasmon resonance - suspension (chemistry) - synapse - synthetic vaccine - systems biology

== T ==
T cell - T-cell antigen receptors - tachykinin - tachykinin receptor - talin protein - tandem repeat sequence - taste bud - TATA box - tax gene product - taxonomy - telophase - tertiary structure - tetrodotoxin - thermochemistry - thermometer - thiamin - thioredoxin - threonine - thrombin - thrombin receptor - thrombomodulin - thromboxane receptor - thylakoid - thyroid hormone receptor - thyrotropin - thyrotropin receptor - thyrotropin-releasing hormone receptor - thyroxine - timeline of biology and organic chemistry - titration - tobacco mosaic virus - topoisomerase - toxin - trans-activator - transcription factor - transcription factor AP-1 - transducin - transformation - transforming growth factor - transforming growth factor alpha - transforming growth factor beta - transforming growth factor beta receptor - transient receptor potential - translation (biology) - transmembrane ATPase - transmembrane helix - transmembrane protein - transmembrane receptor - transport protein - transport vesicle - triiodothyronine - trinucleotide repeat - triose - tropomyosin - troponin - tryptophan - tubulin - tumor necrosis factors - tumor necrosis factor receptor - tyrosine - tyrosine 3-monooxygenase

== U ==
ubiquitin - urea - urea cycle - uric acid - UV/VIS spectroscopy

== V ==
vaccine - vacuole - valence - valine - van der Waals force - van der Waals radius - vapor pressure - vapour pressure - vasoactive intestinal peptide - vasoactive intestinal peptide receptor - vasopressin - vasopressin receptor - venom - vertebrate photoreceptor - vesicle - vestibular system - vimentin - viral envelope protein - viral oncogene protein - viral protein - virology - virus (biology) - vitamin - vitamin D-dependent calcium-binding protein - vitellogenin - vitronectin - von Willebrand factor

== W ==
water

== Y ==
Y chromosome - yeast

== Z ==
zymology

== See also ==
- List of biochemists for people associated with biochemistry.
- List of biomolecules
- List of basic biochemistry topics most basic biochemistry topics that should be covered in an encyclopedia, organized by topic.
- List of chemistry topics, Chemistry basic topics
- List of biology topics, Biology basic topics
- List of molecular biology topics
- List of biochemistry topics
