= Chimerin =

Type of nerve tissue protein

Chimerin is a type of nerve tissue protein.

Chimerins are a family of non-protein kinase C phorbol ester receptors. They were the first phorbol ester receptors to be discovered within this family. They are represented as a family of four closely bound GAPs1 (GTPase-activating proteins). These small GTPases were once characterized as high affinity intracellular receptors for the second messenger diacylglycerol (DAG) and the phorbol ester tumor promoters. The name stems from their resemblance to the "chimera."

== Types ==
Types include:

- Chimerin 1
- Chimerin 2

There are four known isoforms of the chimerin protein. These include α1, α2, β1, and β2. α1-Chimerin was the first protein to be isolated from the brain. The other domains were discovered through alternative splicing. The α and β isoforms are almost identical, the key difference stems from the SH2 domain at the N-terminal.

=== α1 ===
α1-Chimerin is a GTPase-activating protein in the brain that effects the ras related p21rac. α1-Chimerin is also able to regulate dendritic spinal density by binding to NMDA receptors at the NR2A subunit. Over expression of this protein in hippocampus tissue can inhibit the formation of new spines and remove existing spines. Mutations found in α-chi-merin lead to the Duane retraction syndrome 2. Beta-chimerin (Rho GTPase-activating protein 3, 468aa) is mainly found in the brain and pancreas and the expression is in the form of reduced malignant gliomas. Changes in cytoskeletal organization are due to the action on Rac.

=== α2 ===
α2-Chimerin acts in a similar manner to α1-chimerin, but is primarily found in the brain and testes. It is also an SH2 containing GTPase activating protein and bears many similarities in function. It Is derived from alternative splicing of the α-chimera gene.

α2-Chimerin was shown to be involved and important in cognitive development. The expression of α2-chimerin is present in development so α2-chimerin is essential for cognitive function as it directly leads to functioning cognitive ability in adulthood. α2-Chimerin also plays a role in the ocular motor system. Mutations in α2-chimerin can cause disorders such as Duane Retraction Syndrome as it changes the signals on how the eye moves.

=== β2 ===
β2-Chimerin has been shown to play a role in breast cancer. In breast cancer cells the amount of β2-chimerin messengers are extremely low. When introduced to the cancerous cells β2-chimerin then causes the G1 cell cycle to stop and therefore it stops the cells from multiplying.

β2-Chimerin can be linked to a fusion gene that is associated with a key insulin receptor that causes people to have decreased levels of insulin.
