= California Smog Check Program =

Vehicle emission inspection program in California

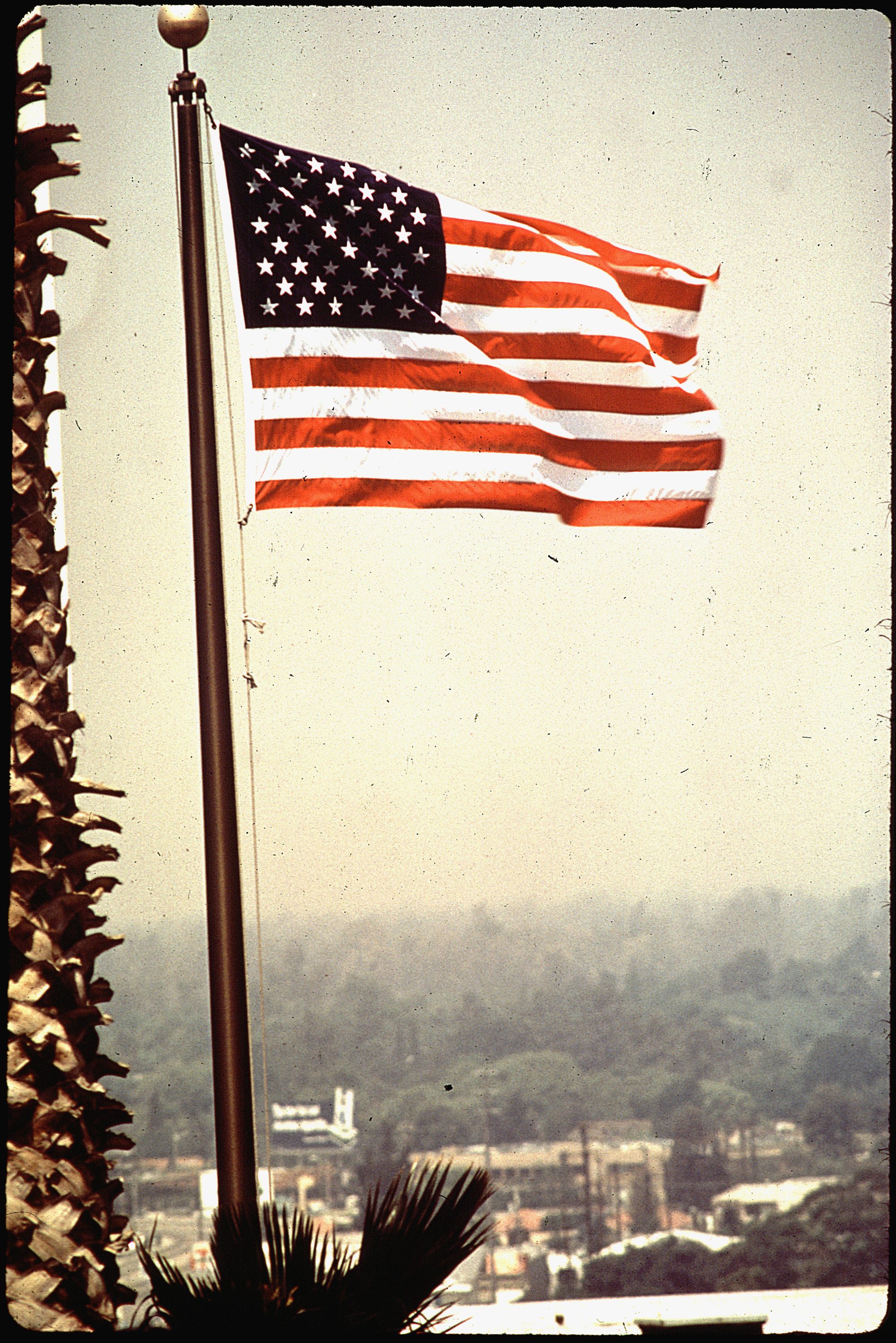
The American flag stands against the backdrop of a smoggy Los Angeles in 1972. The California Smog Check Program is an attempt to reduce smog in California.

The California Smog Check Program is a joint effort between the California Air Resources Board, the California Bureau of Automotive Repair, and the California Department of Motor Vehicles to reduce air pollution from road vehicles. Models that were manufactured in 1976 or later in participating counties are required to have a smog check test biennially (every two years). The program's stated aim is to reduce air pollution from vehicles by ensuring that cars with excessive emissions are repaired in accordance with federal and state guidelines.

With some exceptions, gasoline-powered vehicles, hybrid vehicles, and alternative-fuel vehicles that are eight model-years old or newer are not required to participate; instead, these vehicles pay a smog abatement fee for the first 8 years in place of being required to pass a smog check. The eight-year exception does not apply to nonresident (previously registered out-of-state) vehicles being registered in California for the first time, diesel vehicles 1998 model or newer and weighing 14,000 lbs or less, or specially constructed vehicles 1976 and newer.

A smog check is not required for, motorcycles, electric vehicles trailers, diesel-powered vehicles manufactured before 1998 or weighing over 14,000 lbs, or gasoline-powered vehicles 1975 or older. In April 2015, hybrid vehicles became subject to smog check requirements. Although vehicles 1975 and older or diesel vehicles 1997 or older are not required to get a smog check, owners of these vehicles must still ensure that their emissions systems are intact.

Anyone wishing to sell a vehicle that is over four years old must first have a smog check performed. It is the seller's responsibility to get the smog certificate prior to the sale. If the vehicle is registered in California and was acquired from a spouse, domestic partner, sibling, child, parent, grandparent, or grandchild it is exempt.

== California's history with smog ==
According to the California EPA, "Californians set the pace nationwide in their love affair with cars". The state's 34 million residents own approximately 25 million cars—one for every adult aged 18 years or older.

Smog is created when nitrogen oxides (NO_{x}) and hydrocarbon gases (HC) are exposed to sunlight. The five gasses monitored during a smog check are hydrocarbons, carbon monoxide (CO), nitrogen oxides (NO_{x}), carbon dioxide (CO_{2}), and oxygen (O_{2}).

=== Impact on human health ===
In 1998 the Air Resource Board identified diesel particulate matter as carcinogenic. Further research revealed that it can cause life-shortening health problems such as respiratory illness, heart problems, asthma, and cancer. Diesel particulate matter is the most common airborne toxin that Californians breathe.

Between 2005 and 2007 air pollution led to almost 30,000 hospital and emergency room visits in California for asthma, pneumonia, and other respiratory and cardiovascular ailments. A study by RAND Corporation showed the cost to the state, federal and private health insurers was over $193 million in hospital-based medical care. John Romley lead author of the study. said "California's failure to meet air pollution standards causes a large amount of expensive hospital care." According to the American Lung Association, California's dirty air causes 19,000 premature deaths, 9,400 hospitalizations and more than 300,000 respiratory illnesses including asthma and acute bronchitis.

A study of children living in Southern California found that smog can cause asthma. The study of over 3,000 children showed those living in high-smog areas were more likely to develop asthma if they were avid athletes, when compared to children who did not participate in sports.

More people in California live in areas that do not meet federal clean air standards than in any other state. A report by the American Lung Association states that some areas in California are the most polluted in the United States, with air quality that is likely damaging the health of millions of people. The report finds that Los Angeles, Bakersfield (CA), and Visalia-Porterville (CA) rank among the five U.S. cities most polluted with particulates and ozone.

=== Impact on global warming ===
Carbon dioxide (CO_{2}) is a greenhouse gas that is associated with global warming. Vehicles are a significant source of CO_{2} emissions and thus contribute to global warming. According to an advocacy group Environmental Defense, in 2004, automobiles from the three largest automakers in the US – Ford, GM, and DaimlerChrysler – contributed CO_{2} emissions that were comparable to those from the top 11 electric companies.

Historically, California was hottest in July and August, but as climate change takes place, the temperature may be extended from July through September, according to a report from the team established by the Air Resource Board. Some climate change simulations indicate the global warming impact on California will be an increase in the frequency of hot daytime and nighttime temperatures. The climate change simulations also indicate that drying in the Sacramento area may be evident by the mid 21st century. The California sea level has risen at about 7 inches per century, but this trend could change with global warming. According to the report by the Climate Action Team, “[t]he sea-level rise projections in the 2008 Impacts Assessment indicate that the rate and total sea-level rise in future decades may increase substantially above the recent historical rates”. While all sectors are vulnerable to rising sea-levels, 70 percent of those at risk are residential areas. Hospitals, schools, water treatment plants, and other buildings may be at risk of flooding.

Climate change may also affect California's diverse agricultural sector, since it is likely to change precipitation, temperature averages, pest and weed ranges, and the length of the growing season (this affecting crop productivity). In one study, researchers looked at the possible effects on the agricultural sector in the US and identified some possible effects. Results suggested that climate change will decrease annual crop yields in the long-term, especially for cotton.

Climate change in California could also impact energy consumption. Demand patterns for electricity might be affected as the mean temperatures and the frequency of hot days increases, increasing demand for cooling in summertime.

== Causes of smog ==
Air pollution has two primary sources, biogenic and anthropogenic. Biogenic sources are natural sources, such as volcanoes that spew particulate matter, lightning strikes that cause forest fires, and trees and other vegetation that release pollen and spores into the atmosphere.

Californian greenhouse gas emissions come mostly from transportation, utilities, and industries including refineries, cement, manufacturing, forestry, and agriculture. In 2004, transportation accounted for approximately 40 percent of total greenhouse gas emissions in California. About 80 percent of that came from road transportation.

Population growth increases air pollution, as more vehicles are on the road. California's large population significantly contributes to the high amount of smog and air pollution in the state. In 1930, California's population was less than six million people and the total registered vehicles were two million.

=== Topography ===
On hot, sunny days, pollutants from vehicles, industry, and many products may chemically react with each other. In the winter, temperature inversions can trap tiny particles of smoke and exhaust from vehicles and anything else that burns fuel. This keeps pollution closer to the ground.

== History of the Smog Check Program ==
In 1974 American automobiles manufactured on or after 1966 required a smog inspection upon change of ownership in California by a licensed MVPC Class A Installer/Adjuster technician (Smog Check I). An aftermarket "NO_{x} kit" would be installed on all 1966 to 1973 American automobiles (under 6001 GVW) to lower Nitrous Oxide emissions. After the 1973 model year, automobile manufacturers were required to install factory NO_{x} devices (usually in the form of EGR valves) on all cars sold in California. HC and CO (hydrocarbon and carbon monoxide) limits at idle were also checked by an infrared exhaust analyzer and manually recorded by the technician. A $50 repair cost limit was imposed on vehicles that did not pass emission standards. The first truly comprehensive “Smog Check” program was implemented in March 1984. It came about as a result of "SB 33" which was passed in 1982. The program included a biennial and change of ownership testing, "BAR 84" emissions test plus a visual and functional inspection of various emission control components, a $50 repair cost limit (unless emission device tampering was noted), licensing shops to perform smog checks and mechanic certification for emissions repair competence. The program is generally known as “BAR 84” program. During the BAR 84 program, the first acceleration simulation mode (ASM) test was implemented which tests for two gases, HC and CO (hydrocarbons and carbon monoxide) while the vehicle was run at 2500 RPM for 30 seconds (static test). EGR device functions were also manually tested for lower NO_{x} emissions.

Automobiles with a motor swap performed prior to the March 19, 1984 mandate which was older than the model year of the vehicle e.g. a 1970 LT-1 350 swapped into a 1975 Chevrolet with the 1970 smog gear intact (with documentation e.g. receipts) are considered noncompliant illegal engine swaps including nonstock exhaust swaps e.g. dual catalytic converters with a true dual exhaust not original to the vehicle - this means that the engine swap performed after the date of enactment must be the same model year or newer. Engine swaps which are the same year or newer where the vehicle class did not have it as a manufacturer option (from a Chevrolet S-10 with a late model LSx powertrain transplant with the associated smog gear intact salvaged from the donor vehicle which includes the OBDII diagnostic connections and associated exhaust system with the catalytic converter attached including the secondary downstream oxygen sensor (catalytic converter must be California legal which has a serial number and build date mandated under California state law) must be approved by a 'referee' smog test station where the engine/transmission package is certified where a silver tag is stickered to the door jamb. Although the engine may be newer than the vehicle model year even with an OBDII upgrade the automobile must be tested based on the model year using the test criteria based on the VIN and registration. This means that even with an OBDII powertrain upgrade regardless of the engine swap being 1996 and newer, the vehicle being smogged must be tested using BAR97 criteria, not the OBDII standard procedure.

In 1997 important laws were passed that made significant changes to Smog Check II.

- AB 57 created a financial assistance program.
- AB 208 provided funding for low-income assistance and vehicle retirement
- AB 1492 exempted vehicles less than four years old from the biennial smog check
- AB 42 exempted vehicles manufactured before 1978 from smog check testing. Also required that vehicles 20 years old or older be exempt from the Smog Check program starting in 2004. AB 42 established a brief rolling chassis exemption until it was repealed in 2006 where 1976 and newer vehicles were subjected to emission testing.

In 1999, “AB 1105” made additional changes to the program. It authorized but did not require the Bureau of Automotive Repairs (BAR) to exempt vehicles up to six years old from the biennial smog check and gave the agency authorization to except additional vehicles by low-emitter profiling (Schwartz). It also created additional changes to the repair assistance program and provided BAR with increased flexibility for how much to pay drivers whose vehicle failed the smog check so that the vehicle may be scrapped.

In 2010 the Air Resource Board and the Bureau of Automotive Repair jointly sponsored legislation, "AB 2289", that is designed to improve the program to reduce air pollution through “the use of new technologies that provide considerable time and cost savings to consumers while at the same time improving consumer protections by adopting more stringent fine structures to respond to stations and technicians that perform improper and incomplete inspections”. The bill, which passed and took effect in 2013, will allow for a major upgrade in technologies used to test vehicle emissions. According to ARB Chairman, Mary D. Nichols, “[t]his new and improved program will have the same result as taking 800,000 vehicles away from California residents, also resulting in a more cost effective program for California motorists”. One way the program would reduce costs is by taking advantage of on-board diagnostic (OBDII) technology that has been installed on new vehicles since 1996. The program will eliminate tailpipe testing of post-1999 vehicles and instead use the vehicle's own emissions monitoring systems. This system has saved consumers in 22 states time and money. Vehicles manufactured in the model years between 1976 and 1999 are now required to pass a more stringent dynamometer-based tail-pipe test than was previously required. A high number of vehicles in this range have begun to fail the emissions test with the arrival of their first test-year under the new rule; some question the influence of the automotive industry on the new rule and the inherent push and perceived unfair requirement to purchase a new or near-new vehicle to replace an otherwise functional and OBDII compliant vehicle.

== Smog check process ==
The Department of Motor Vehicles (DMV) sends a registration renewal notice which indicates if a smog check is required. If the DMV requires a smog check for a vehicle, the owner must comply with the notice within 90 days and provide a completed smog check certificate.

A smog check inspection is performed by a station that has been licensed by the California Bureau of Automotive Repair (BAR). Depending on the situation, the owner may be required to take the vehicle to one of the following types of smog check stations:

- Test-only station, one that can perform the smog check test, but cannot make repairs.
- Test-and-repair station, one that can both perform the smog check and repair the vehicle.
- Repair-only station, one that can only repair the vehicle, but cannot perform the test itself.
- STAR station, one that meets the BAR's higher performance standards. Some STAR stations are test-only stations, while other STAR stations are test-and-repair.

Until a smog certificate can be provided registration will not be renewed. If the vehicle fails the smog check, the owner will be required to complete all necessary repairs and pass a smog check retest in order to complete the registration. If the costs of repairing the vehicle outweigh its value, the state may buy it and have it scrapped. The buyback program is part of California's Consumer Assistance Program (CAP) that also offers consumer assistance for repairs related to smog check. The program is administered by the Bureau of Automotive Repair.

== Participating counties ==
Residents are never exempt from the smog inspection requirements.

County	Smog check required? (As of 2022)
Alameda	Yes
Alpine	Yes
Amador	Yes
Butte	Yes
Calaveras	Yes
Colusa	Yes
Contra Costa	Yes
Del Norte	Yes
El Dorado	Yes
Fresno	Yes
Glenn	Yes
Humboldt	Yes
Imperial	Yes
Inyo	Yes
Kern	Yes
Kings	Yes
Lake	Yes
Lassen	Yes
Los Angeles	Yes
Madera	Yes
Marin	Yes
Mariposa	Yes
Mendocino	Yes
Merced	Yes
Modoc	Yes
Mono	Yes
Monterey	Yes
Napa	Yes
Nevada	Yes
Orange	Yes
Placer	Yes
Plumas	Yes
Riverside	Yes
Sacramento	Yes
San Benito	Yes
San Bernardino	Yes
San Diego	Yes
San Francisco	Yes
San Joaquin	Yes
San Luis Obispo	Yes
San Mateo	Yes
Santa Barbara	Yes
Santa Clara	Yes
Santa Cruz	Yes
Shasta	Yes
Sierra	Yes
Siskiyou	Yes
Solano	Yes
Sonoma	Yes
Stanislaus	Yes
Sutter	Yes
Tehama	Yes
Trinity	Yes
Tulare	Yes
Tuolumne	Yes
Ventura	Yes
Yolo	Yes
Yuba	Yes

== Policy tools ==
Air is susceptible to the Tragedy of the Commons, but that can be overcome with policy tools. In their book Environmental Law and Policy, Salzman and Thompson describe these policy tools as the "5 P’s" - Prescriptive Regulation, Property Rights, Penalties, Payments, and Persuasion.

Throughout the years there have been some tensions between the US EPA and the California EPA with disagreements centered on California's Smog Check Policy (The Press-Enterprise, 1997). One disagreement has been over where smog checks are performed. The EPA believes that smog checks and smog repairs must be done separately, to avoid conflicts of interest.

For years, California has been asking the US EPA to approve a waiver allowing it to enforce its own greenhouse gas emission standards for new motor vehicles. A request was made in December 2005, but denied in March 2008 under the Bush administration, when interpretations of the Clean Air Act found California did not have the need for special emission standards. However, shortly after taking office, president Obama asked the EPA to assess if it was appropriate to deny the waiver and subsequently allowed the waiver. US EPA's interpretation of the Clean Air Act allows California to have its own vehicle emissions program and set greenhouse gas standards due to the state's unique need.

Car manufacturers have been strongly opposed to the emission standards set by California, arguing that regulation imposes further costs on consumers. In 2004, California approved the world's most stringent standards to reduce auto emissions, and the auto industry threatened to challenge the regulations in court. The new regulations required car makers to cut exhaust from cars and light trucks by 25% and from larger trucks and SUVs by 18%, standards that must be met by 2016. The auto industry argued that California's Air Resource Board did not have the authority to adopt such regulation and that the new standards could not be met with the current technology. They further argued that it would raise vehicle costs by as much as $3,000. The agency, however, countered that argument by saying that the additional costs would only be about $1,000 by 2016.

The Obama administration has proposed setting a national standard for greenhouse gas emissions from vehicles, which could potentially increase fuel efficiency by an average of 5% per year from 2012 to 2016.

== Evaluation ==
According to the California Air Resources Board, the California Smog Check program removes about 400 tons of smog-forming pollutants from California's air every day.

On March 12, 2009, the Bureau of Automotive Repair and the Air Resource Board hired Sierra Research, Inc. to analyze the data collected in the BAR's Roadside Inspection Program to evaluate the effectiveness of the Smog Check Program from data collected in 2003–2006. Under the Roadside Inspection Program vehicles are randomly inspected at checkpoints set up by the California Highway Patrol (CHP). One objective of the evaluation was to compare the post smog check performance of pre-1996 (1974–1995) vehicles to the post smog check performance determined from a previous evaluation collected in 2000–2002. The report made several recommendations to reduce the number of vehicles failing the Roadside test. One was to develop a method for evaluating station performance. The other was to perform inspections immediately following certifications at smog check stations. Finally, the report recommended continued use of the Roadside test to evaluate the effectiveness of the Smog Check program.

== See also ==
- United States vehicle emission standards
- Vehicle inspection in the United States
