= Malpighian =

Malpighian is an attribute to several anatomical structures discovered by, described by or attributed to Marcello Malpighi:

- Malpighian corpuscle (disambiguation)
  - Renal corpuscle, the initial filtering component of nephrons in the kidneys
  - Splenic lymphoid nodules or white nodules, follicles in the white pulp of the spleen
- Malpighian layer of the skin, a term with various definitions
- Malpighian tubule system, an excretory and osmoregulatory system found in some insects, myriapods, arachnids and tardigrades

== See also ==
- Malpighiales, an order of flowering plants
  - Malpighia, a genus in the order
