= Biogenic substance =

Product made by or of life forms

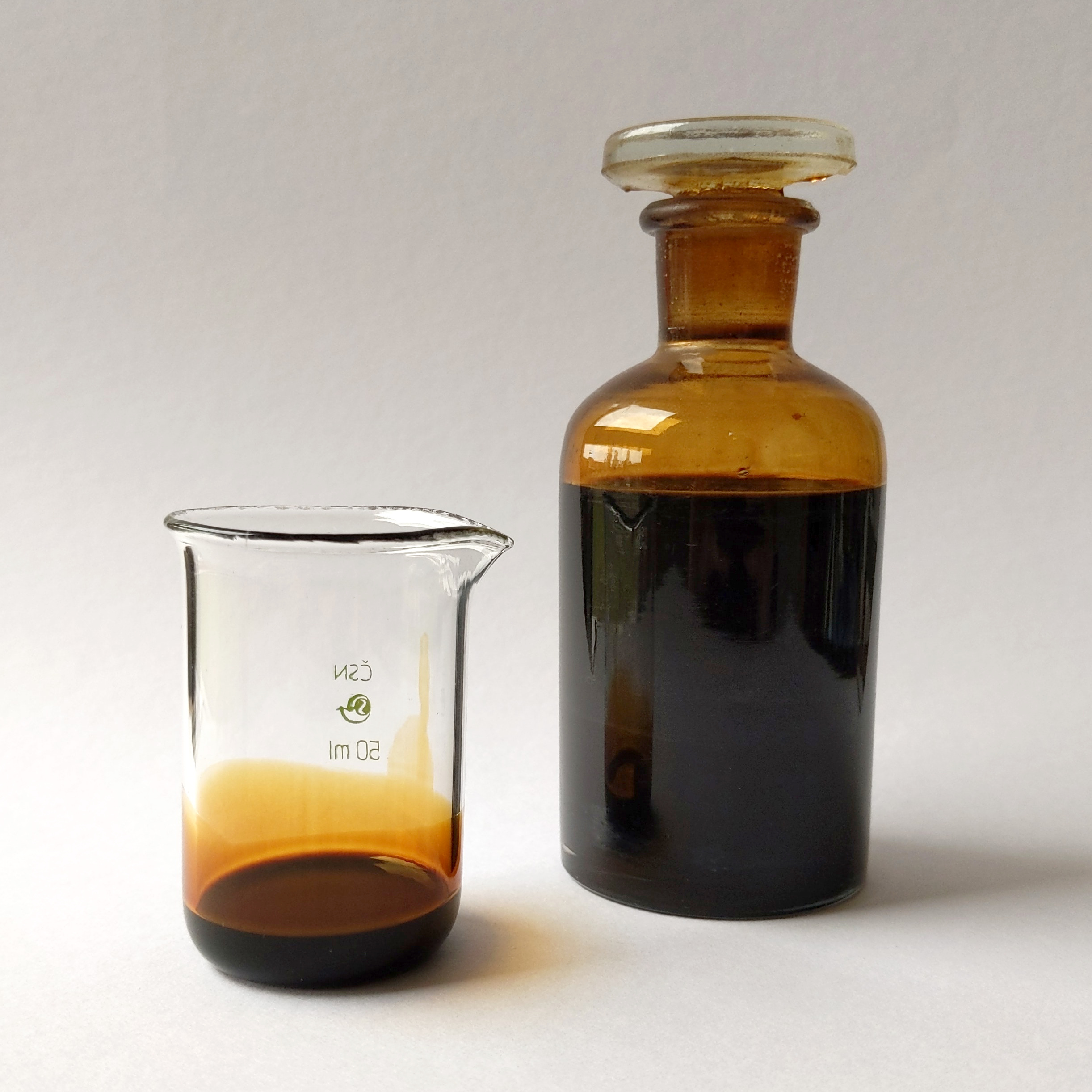
Crude oil, a transformed biogenic substance

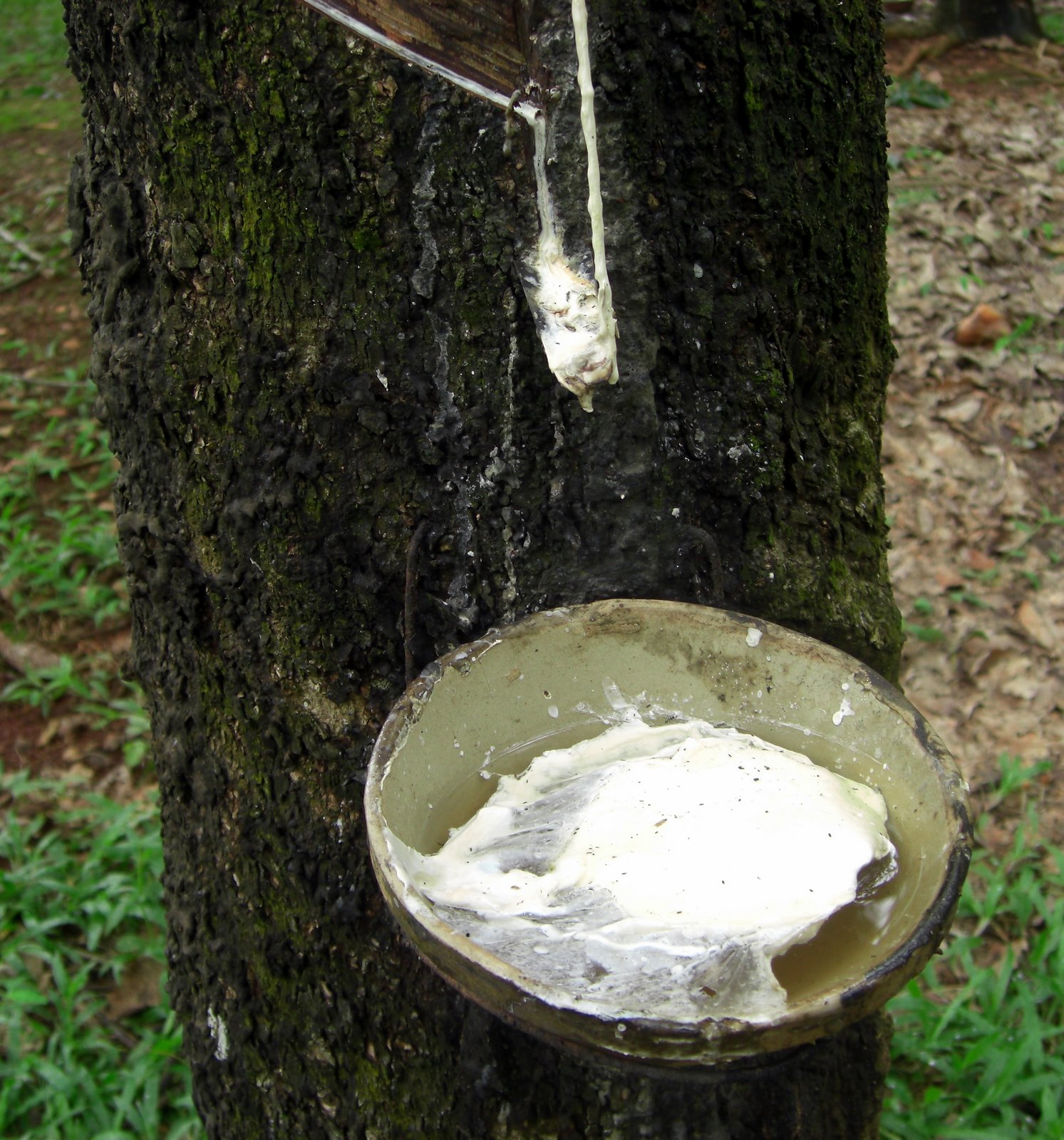
Natural gum, a secretion from Hevea brasiliensis

A biogenic substance is a product made by or of life forms. While the term originally was specific to metabolite compounds that had toxic effects on other organisms, it has developed to encompass any constituents, secretions, and metabolites of plants or animals. In context of molecular biology, biogenic substances are referred to as biomolecules. They are generally isolated and measured through the use of chromatography and mass spectrometry techniques. Additionally, the transformation and exchange of biogenic substances can by modelled in the environment, particularly their transport in waterways.

The observation and measurement of biogenic substances is notably important in the fields of geology and biochemistry. A large proportion of isoprenoids and fatty acids in geological sediments are derived from plants and chlorophyll, and can be found in samples extending back to the Precambrian. These biogenic substances are capable of withstanding the diagenesis process in sediment, but may also be transformed into other materials. This makes them useful as biomarkers for geologists to verify the age, origin and degradation processes of different rocks.

Biogenic substances have been studied as part of marine biochemistry since the 1960s, which has involved investigating their production, transport, and transformation in the water, and how they may be used in industrial applications. A large fraction of biogenic compounds in the marine environment are produced by micro and macro algae, including cyanobacteria. Due to their antimicrobial properties they are currently the subject of research in both industrial projects, such as for anti-fouling paints, or in medicine.

== History of discovery and classification ==
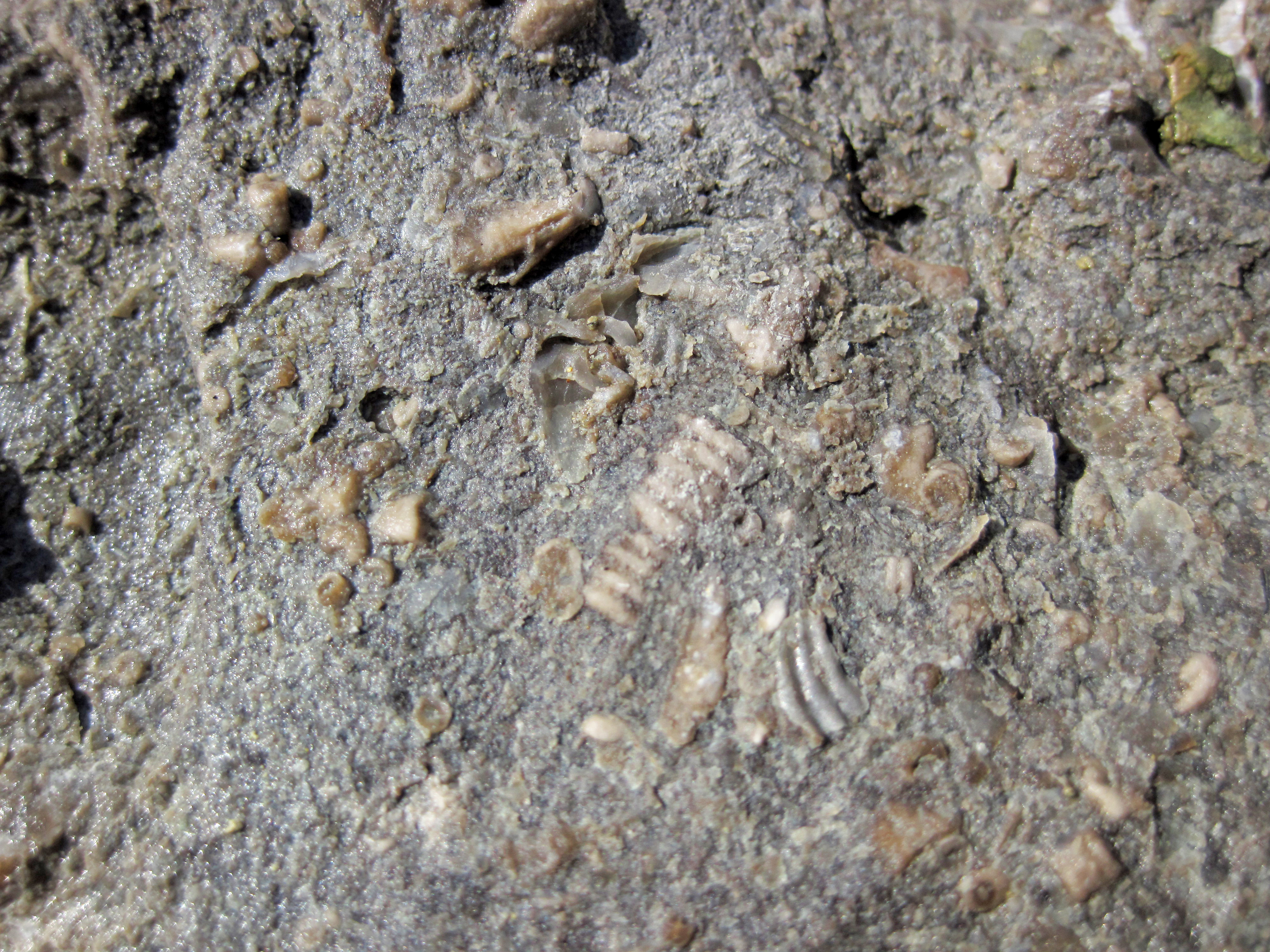
Biogenic sediment: limestone containing fossils

During a meeting of the New York Academy of Sciences' Section of Geology and Mineralogy in 1903, geologist Amadeus William Grabau proposed a new rock classification system in his paper 'Discussion of and Suggestions Regarding a New Classification of Rocks'. Within the primary subdivision of "Endogenetic rocks" – rocks formed through chemical processes – was a category termed "Biogenic rocks", which was used synonymously with "Organic rocks". Other secondary categories were "Igneous" and "Hydrogenic" rocks.

In the 1930s German chemist Alfred E. Treibs first detected biogenic substances in petroleum as part of his studies of porphyrins. Based on this research, there was a later increase in the 1970s in the investigation of biogenic substances in sedimentary rocks as part of the study of geology. This was facilitated by the development of more advanced analytical methods, and led to greater collaboration between geologists and organic chemists in order to research the biogenic compounds in sediments.

Researchers additionally began to investigate the production of compounds by microorganisms in the marine environment during the early 1960s. By 1975, different research areas had developed in the study of marine biochemistry. These were "marine toxins, marine bioproducts and marine chemical ecology". Following this in 1994, Teuscher and Lindequist defined biogenic substances as "chemical compounds which are synthesised by living organisms and which, if they exceed certain concentrations, cause temporary or permanent damage or even death of other organisms by chemical or physicochemical effects" in their book, Biogene Gifte. This emphasis in research and classification on the toxicity of biogenic substances was partly due to the cytotoxicity-directed screening assays that were used to detect the biologically active compounds. The diversity of biogenic products has since been expanded from cytotoxic substances through the use of alternative pharmaceutical and industrial assays.

== In the environment ==
=== Hydroecology ===
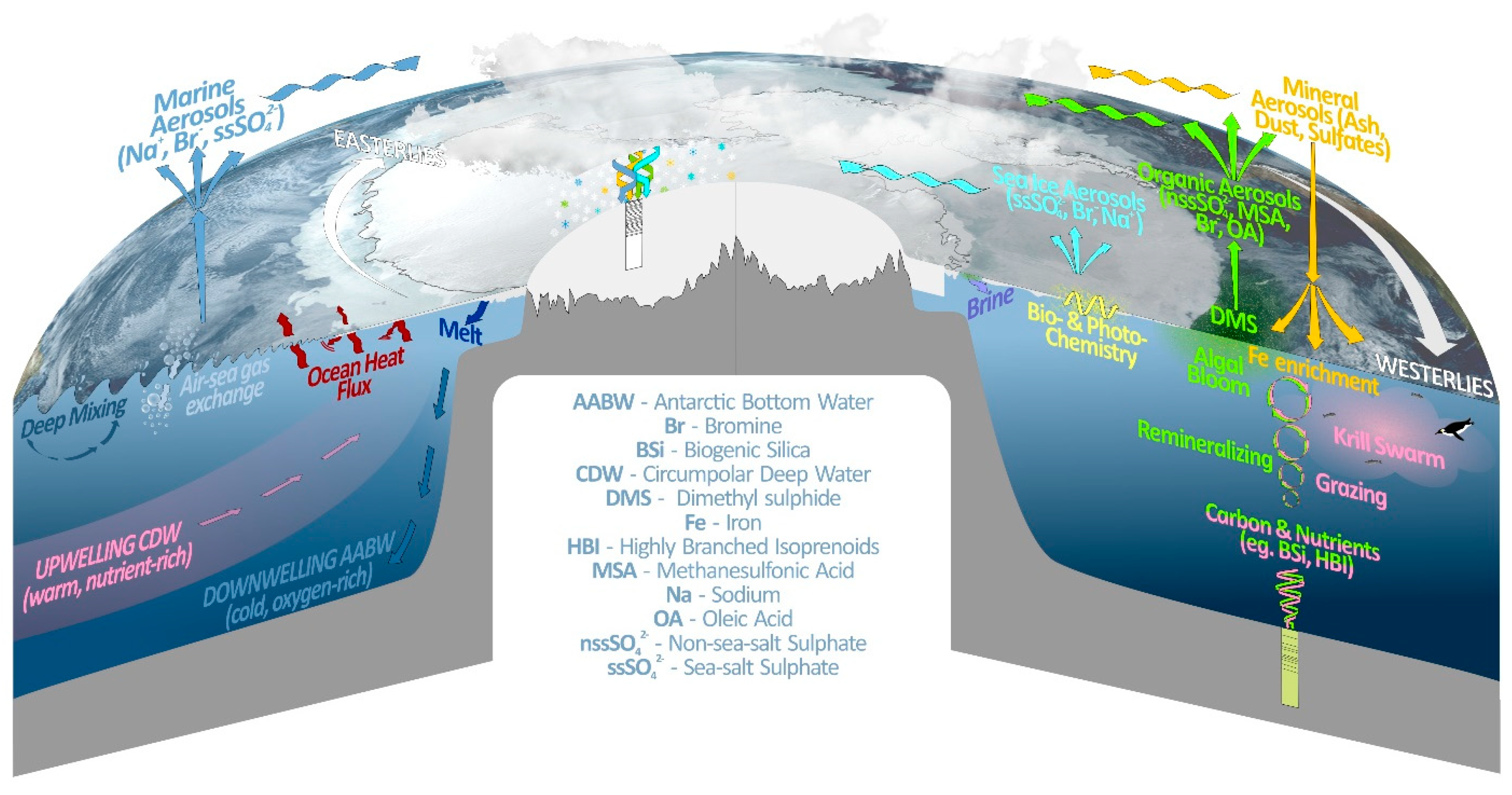
Model of movement of marine compounds

Through studying the transport of biogenic substances in the Tatar Strait in the Sea of Japan, a Russian team noted that biogenic substances can enter the marine environment due to input from either external sources, transport inside the water masses, or development by metabolic processes within the water. They can likewise be expended due to biotransformation processes, or biomass formation by microorganisms. In this study the biogenic substance concentrations, transformation frequency, and turnover were all highest in the upper layer of the water. Additionally, in different regions of the strait the biogenic substances with the highest annual transfer were constant. These were O_{2}, DOC, and DISi, which are normally found in large concentrations in natural water. The biogenic substances that tend to have lower input through the external boundaries of the strait and therefore least transfer were mineral and detrital components of N and P. These same substances take active part in biotransformation processes in the marine environment and have lower annual output as well.

=== Geological sites ===
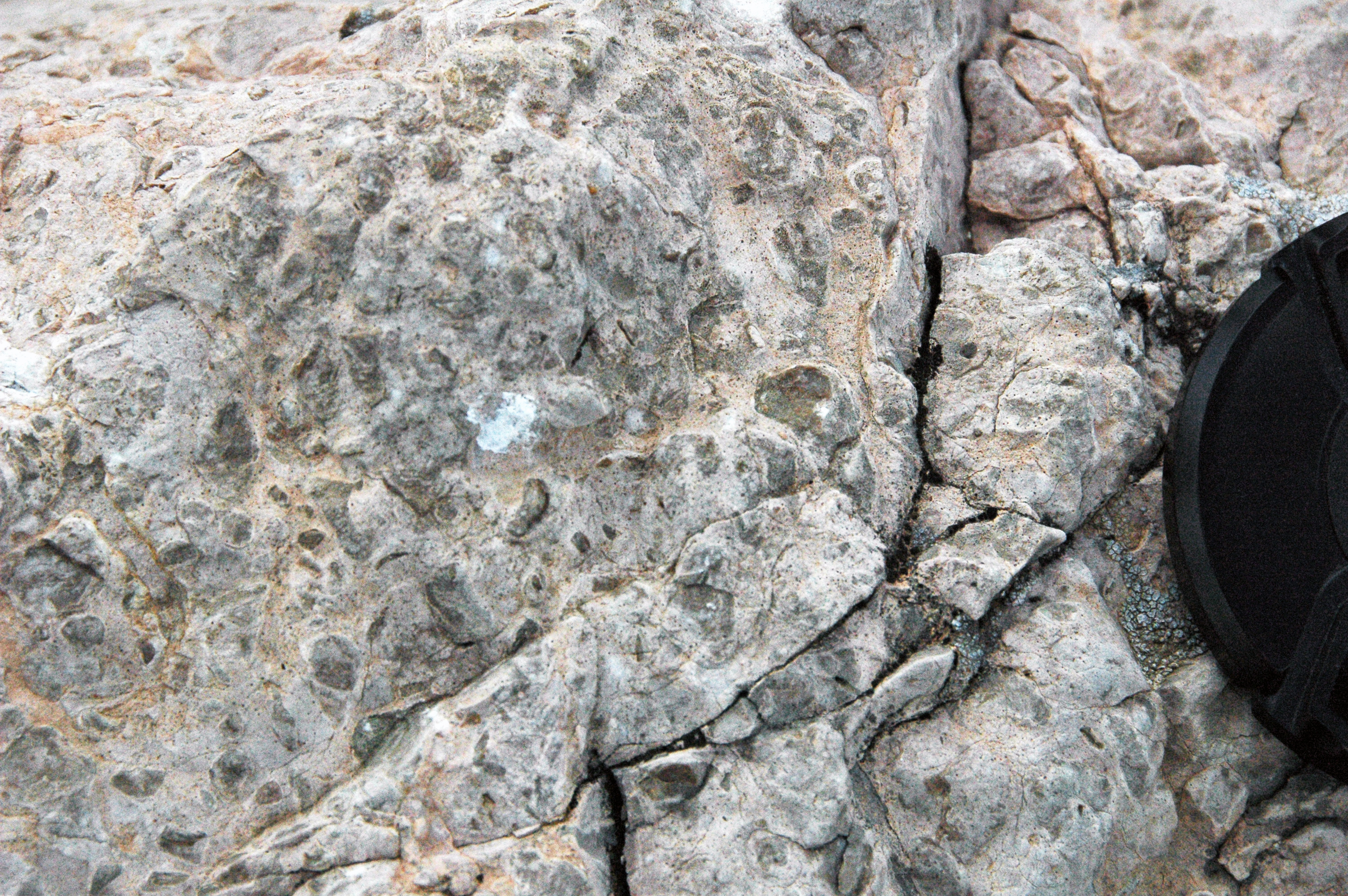
Oncolitic limestone: the spheroidal oncolites are formed via deposition of calcium carbonate by cyanobacteria

Organic geochemists also have an interest in studying the diagenesis of biogenic substances in petroleum and how they are transformed in sediment and fossils. While 90% of this organic material is insoluble in common organic solvents – called kerogen – 10% is in a form that is soluble and can be extracted, from where biogenic compounds can then be isolated. Saturated linear fatty acids and pigments have the most stable chemical structures and are therefore suited to withstanding degradation from the diagenesis process and being detected in their original forms. However, macromolecules have also been found in protected geological regions. Typical sedimentation conditions involve enzymatic, microbial and physicochemical processes as well as increased temperature and pressure, which lead to transformations of biogenic substances. For example, pigments that arise from dehydrogenation of chlorophyll or hemin can be found in many sediments as nickel or vanadyl complexes. A large proportion of the isoprenoids in sediments are also derived from chlorophyll. Similarly, linear saturated fatty acids discovered in the Messel oil shale of the Messel Pit in Germany arise from organic material of vascular plants.

Additionally, alkanes and isoprenoids are found in soluble extracts of Precambrian rock, indicating the probable existence of biological material more than three billion years ago. However, there is the potential that these organic compounds are abiogenic in nature, especially in Precambrian sediments. While Studier et al.'s (1968) simulations of the synthesis of isoprenoids in abiogenic conditions did not produce the long-chain isoprenoids used as biomarkers in fossils and sediments, traces of C_{9}-C_{14} isoprenoids were detected. It is also possible for polyisoprenoid chains to be stereoselectively synthesised using catalysts such as Al(C_{2}H_{5})_{3} – VCl_{3}. However, the probability of these compounds being available in the natural environment is unlikely.

== Measurement ==
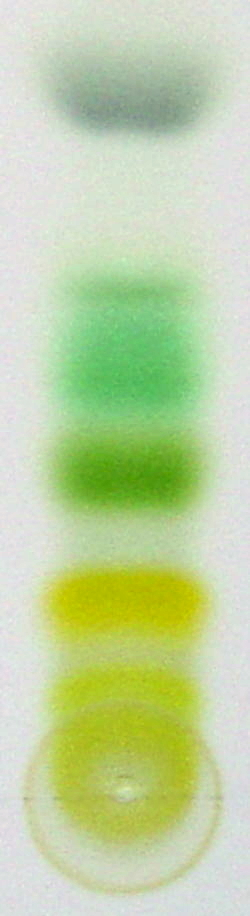
Chromatographic separation of chlorophyll

The different biomolecules that make up a plant's biogenic substances – particularly those in seed exudates - can be identified by using different varieties of chromatography in a lab environment. For metabolite profiling, gas chromatography-mass spectrometry is used to find flavonoids such as quercetin. Compounds can then be further differentiated using reversed-phase high-performance liquid chromatography-mass spectrometry.

When it comes to measuring biogenic substances in a natural environment such as a body of water, a hydroecological CNPSi model can be used to calculate the spatial transport of biogenic substances, in both the horizontal and vertical dimensions. This model takes into account the water exchange and flow rate, and yields the values of biogenic substance rates for any area or layer of the water for any month. There are two main evaluation methods involved: measuring per unit water volume (mg/m^{3} year) and measuring substances per entire water volume of layer (t of element/year). The former is mostly used to observe biogenic substance dynamics and individual pathways for flux and transformations, and is useful when comparing individual regions of the strait or waterway. The second method is used for monthly substance fluxes and must take into account that there are monthly variations in the water volume in the layers.

In the study of geochemistry, biogenic substances can be isolated from fossils and sediments through a process of scraping and crushing the target rock sample, then washing with 40% hydrofluoric acid, water, and benzene/methanol in the ratio 3:1. Following this, the rock pieces are ground and centrifuged to produce a residue. Chemical compounds are then derived through various chromatography and mass spectrometry separations. However, extraction should be accompanied by rigorous precautions to ensure there is no amino acid contaminants from fingerprints, or silicone contaminants from other analytical treatment methods.

== Applications ==
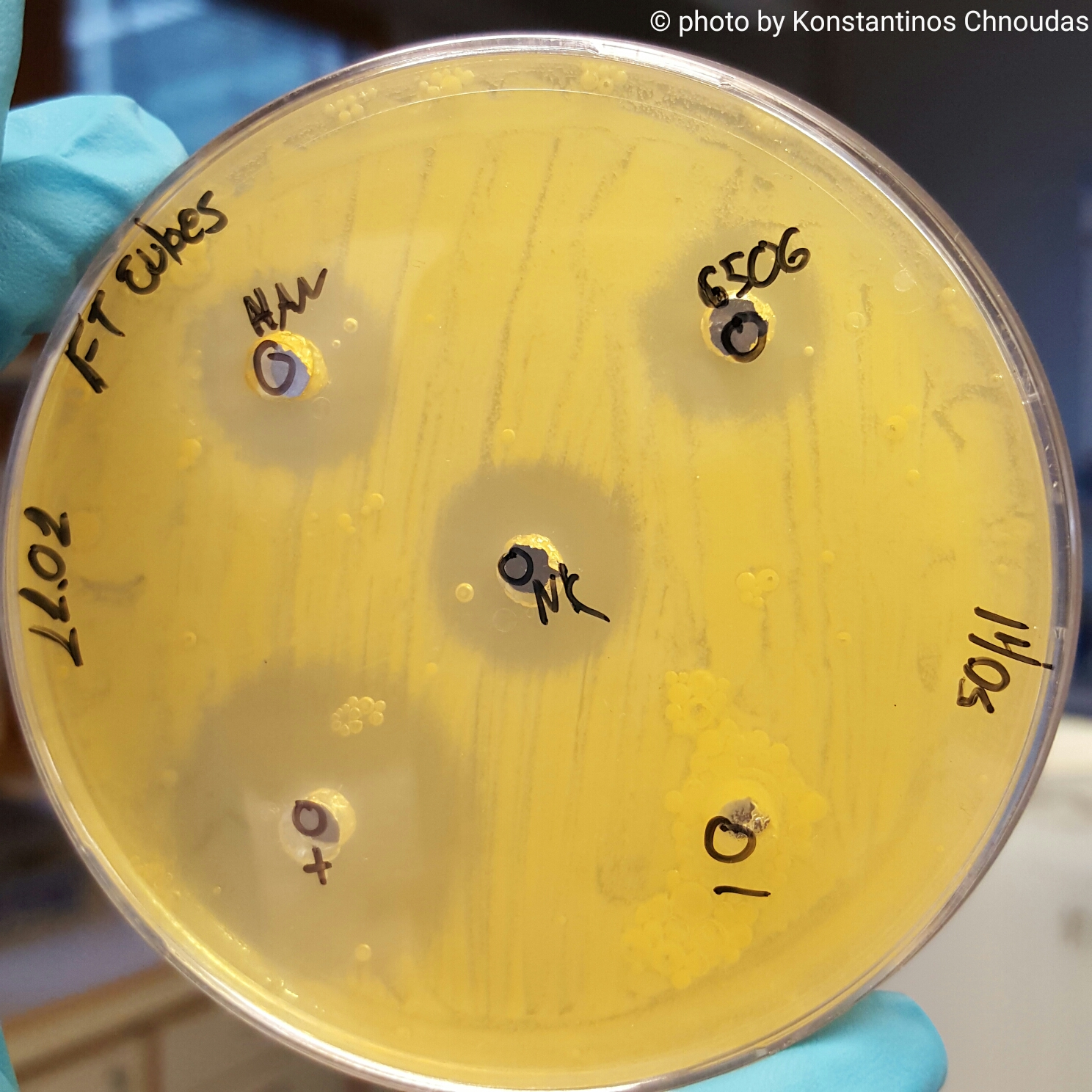
Cyanobacteria extracts inhibiting the growth of Micrococcus luteus

=== Anti-fouling paints ===
Metabolites produced by marine algae have been found to have many antimicrobial properties. This is because they are produced by the marine organisms as chemical deterrents and as such contain bioactive compounds. The principal classes of marine algae that produce these types of secondary metabolites are Cyanophyceae, Chlorophyceae and Rhodophyceae. Observed biogenic products include polyketides, amides, alkaloids, fatty acids, indoles and lipopeptides. For example, over 10% of compounds isolated from Lyngbya majuscula, which is one of the most abundant cyanobacteria, have antifungal and antimicrobial properties. Additionally, a study by Ren et al. (2002) tested halogenated furanones produced by Delisea pulchra from the Rhodophyceae class against the growth of Bacillus subtilis. When applied at a 40 μg/mL concentration, the furanone inhibited the formation of a biofilm by the bacteria and reduced the biofilm's thickness by 25% and the number of live cells by 63%.

These characteristics then have the potential to be utilised in man-made materials, such as making anti-fouling paints without the environment-damaging chemicals. Environmentally safe alternatives are needed to TBT (tin-based antifouling agent) which releases toxic compounds into water and the environment and has been banned in several countries. A class of biogenic compounds that has had a sizeable effect against the bacteria and microalgae that cause fouling are acetylene sesquiterpenoid esters produced by Caulerpa prolifera (from the Chlorophyceae class), which Smyrniotopoulos et al. (2003) observed inhibiting bacterial growth with up to 83% of the efficacy of TBT oxide.

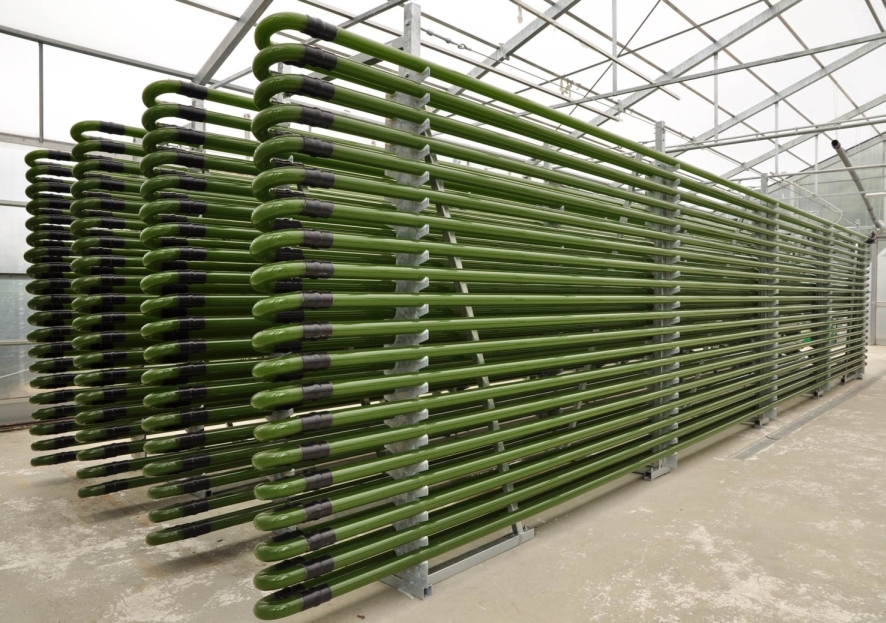
Photobioreactor used to produce microalgae metabolites

Current research also aims to produce these biogenic substances on a commercial level using metabolic engineering techniques. By pairing these techniques with biochemical engineering design, algae and their biogenic substances can be produced on a large scale using photobioreactors. Different system types can be used to yield different biogenic products.

Examples of photobioreactor use for biogenic compound production
Photobioreactor type	Algae species cultured	Product	Reference
Seaweed type polyurethane	Scytonema sp.TISTR 8208	Cyclic dodecapeptide antibiotic effective against Gram-positive bacteria, filamentous fungi and pathogenic yeasts	Chetsumon et al. (1998)
Stirred tank	Agardhiella subulata	Biomass	Huang and Rorrer (2003)
Airlift	Gyrodinium impundicum	Sulphated exopolysaccharides for antiviral action against encephalomyocarditis virus	Yim et al. (2003)
Large scale outdoor	Haematococcus pluvialis	Astaxanthin compound	Miguel (2000)

=== Paleochemotaxonomy ===
In the field of paleochemotaxonomy the presence of biogenic substances in geological sediments is useful for comparing old and modern biological samples and species. These biological markers can be used to verify the biological origin of fossils and serve as paleo-ecological markers. For example, the presence of pristane indicates that the petroleum or sediment is of marine origin, while biogenic material of non-marine origin tends to be in the form of polycyclic compounds or phytane. The biological markers also provide valuable information about the degradation reactions of biological material in geological environments. Comparing the organic material between geologically old and recent rocks shows the conservation of different biochemical processes.

=== Metallic nanoparticle production ===
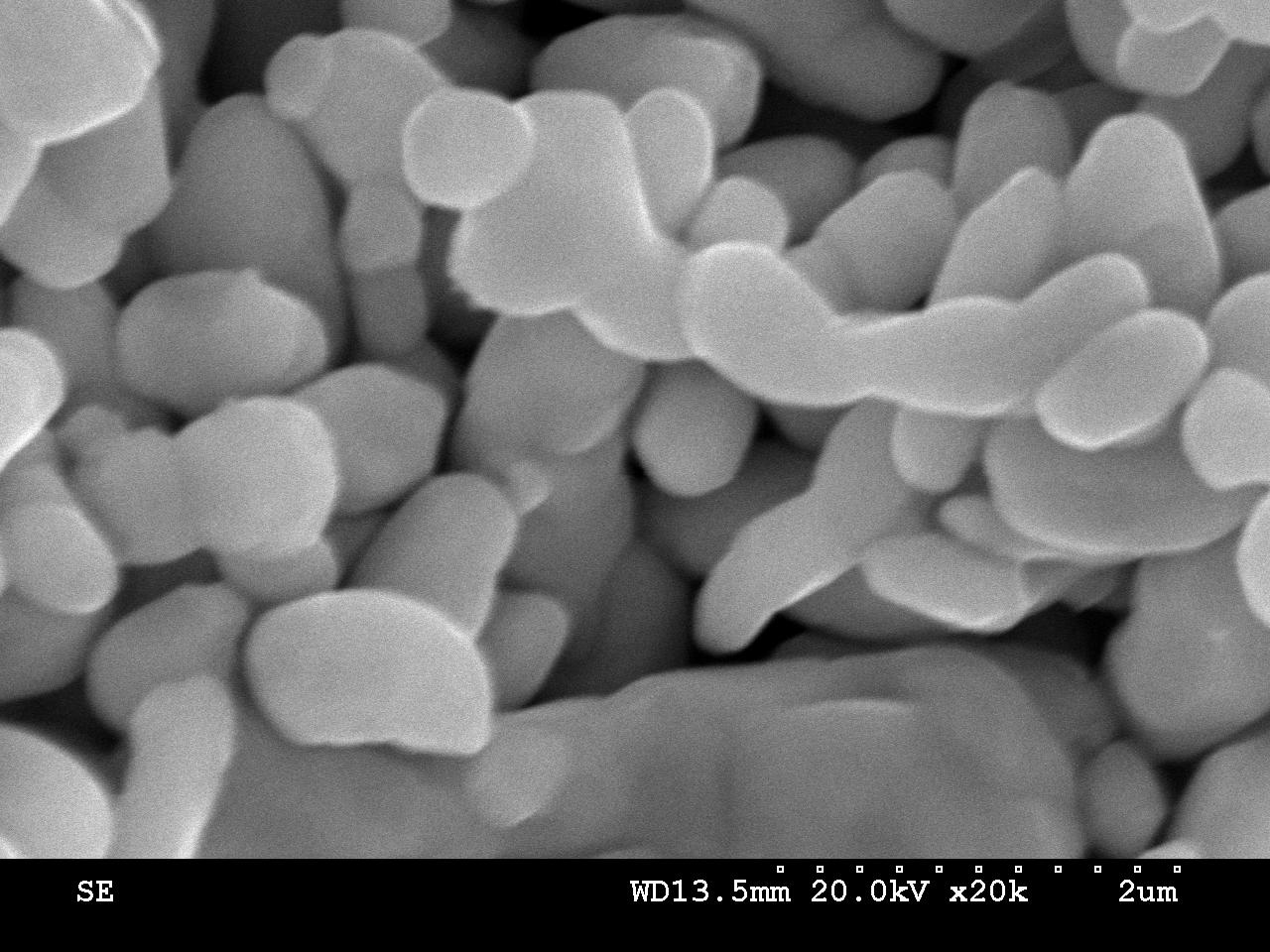
Scanning electron microscope image of silver nanoparticles

Another application of biogenic substances is in the synthesis of metallic nanoparticles. The current chemical and physical production methods for nanoparticles used are costly and produce toxic waste and pollutants in the environment. Additionally, the nanoparticles that are produced can be unstable and unfit for use in the body. Using plant-derived biogenic substances aims to create an environmentally-friendly and cost-effective production method. The biogenic phytochemicals used for these reduction reactions can be derived from plants in numerous ways, including a boiled leaf broth, biomass powder, whole plant immersion in solution, or fruit and vegetable juice extracts. C. annuum juices have been shown to produce Ag nanoparticles at room temperature when treated with silver ions and additionally deliver essential vitamins and amino acids when consumed, making them a potential nanomaterials agent. Another procedure is through the use of a different biogenic substance: the exudate of germinating seeds. When seeds are soaked, they passively release phytochemicals into the surrounding water, which after reaching equilibrium can be mixed with metal ions to synthesise metallic nanoparticles. M. sativa exudate in particular has had success in effectively producing Ag metallic particles, while L. culinaris is an effective reactant for manufacturing Au nanoparticles. This process can also be further adjusted by manipulating factors such as pH, temperature, exudate dilution and plant origin to produce different shapes of nanoparticles, including triangles, spheres, rods, and spirals. These biogenic metallic nanoparticles then have applications as catalysts, glass window coatings to insulate heat, in biomedicine, and in biosensor devices.

== Examples ==
Chemical structure of lupeol, a triterpenoid derived from plants

- Coal and oil are possible examples of constituents which may have undergone changes over geologic time periods.
- Chalk and limestone are examples of secretions (marine animal shells) which are of geologic age.
- Grass and wood are biogenic constituents of contemporary origin.
- Pearls, silk and ambergris are examples of secretions of contemporary origin.
- Biogenic neurotransmitters.

=== Table of isolated biogenic compounds ===
Chemical class	Compound	Source	Reference
Lipopeptide	Lyngbyaloside; Radiosumin	Lyngbya bouillonii; Plectonema radiosum	Klein, Braekman, Daloze, Hoffmann & Demoulin (1997); Mooberry, Stratman & Moore (1995)
Fatty acid	Sulfolipid; Linolenic acid	Lyngbya lagerheimii; Synechococcus sp.	Gustafson et al. (1989); Ohta et al. (1994)
Terpene	Triterpenoid	Prochlorothrix hollandica, Messel oil shale	Simonin, Jürgens & Rohmer (1996), Albrecht & Ourisson (1971)
Alkaloid	Cylindrospermopsin; Welwistatin	Cylindrospermopsis raciborskii; Hapalosiphon welwitschii	Saker & Eaglesham (1999); Zhang & Smith (1996)
Ketone	Arborinone	Messel oil shale	Albrecht & Ourisson (1971)

== Abiogenic (opposite) ==
An abiogenic substance or process does not result from the present or past activity of living organisms. Abiogenic products may, e.g., be minerals, other inorganic compounds, as well as simple organic compounds (e.g. extraterrestrial methane, see also abiogenesis).

== See also ==
- Biogenic amine receptor
- Biogenic silica
- Biogenic sulfide corrosion
- Biomass
- Biomineralization
- Natural product
- Microalgae
- Phytochemical
