= Chimerin 2 =

Protein found in humans

CHN2
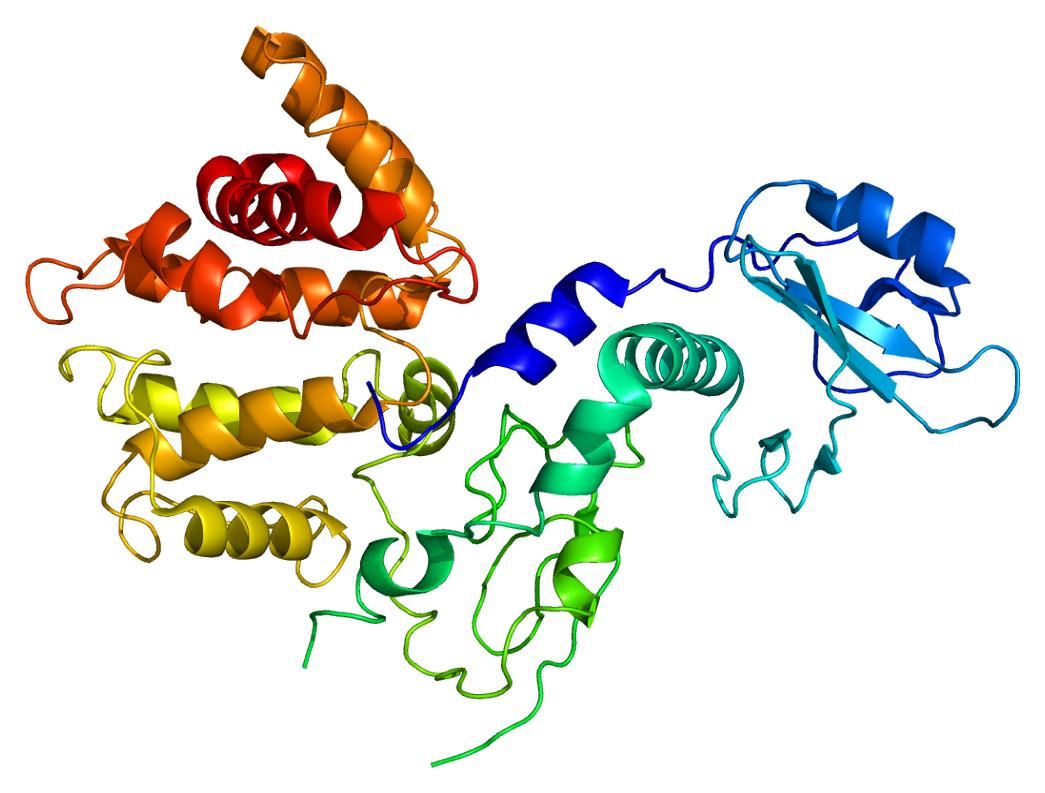

Identifiers
- Aliases: CHN2, ARHGAP3, BCH, CHN2-3, RHOGAP3, chimerin 2
- External IDs: OMIM: 602857; MGI: 1917243; GeneCards: CHN2
Available structures
| PDB | Ortholog search: PDBe RCSB |
| PDB | List of PDB id codes 1XA6 |

Gene location (Mouse)
| Chr. | Chromosome 6 (mouse) |
| Band | 6|6 B3 | Start | 54,016,539 bp |
| Band | 6|6 B3 | End | 54,278,795 bp |
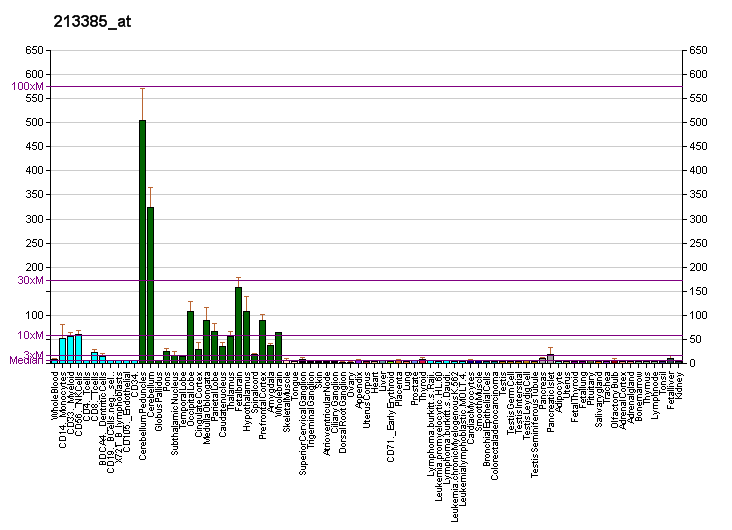

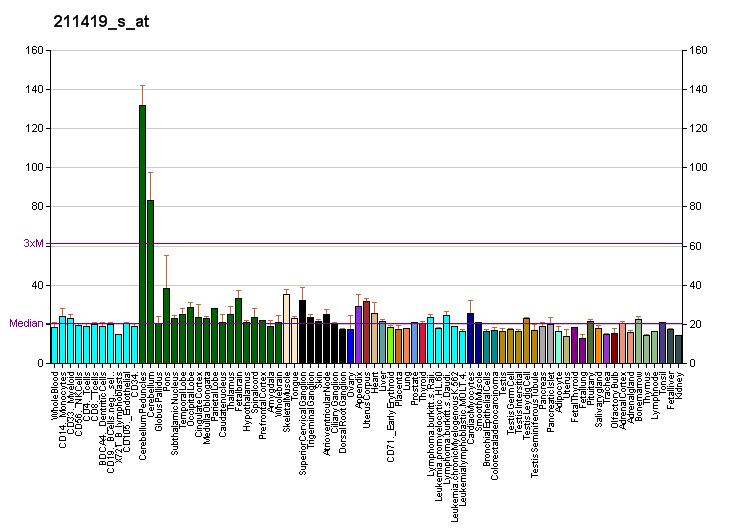

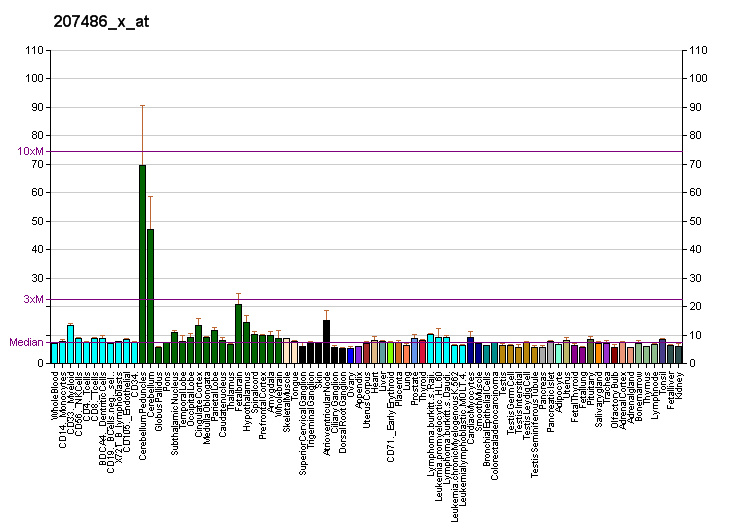
RNA expression pattern
| Bgee | Human / Mouse (ortholog); n/a / Top expressed in: lobe of cerebellum; cerebellar vermis; seminiferous tubule; olfactory tubercle; spermatid; zygote; nucleus accumbens; lateral septal nucleus; pontine nuclei; interventricular septum |
| BioGPS | More reference expression data |
Gene ontology
| Molecular function | protein binding; metal ion binding; GTPase activator activity |
| Cellular component | cytoplasm; cytosol; membrane |
| Biological process | intracellular signal transduction; regulation of small GTPase mediated signal transduction; signal transduction; positive regulation of signal transduction; positive regulation of GTPase activity; regulation of GTPase activity |
Sources:Amigo / QuickGO
Orthologs
| Databases | NCBI: entry; OMA: entry |
| Species | Human | Mouse |
| Entrez | 1124 | 69993 |
| Ensembl | ENSG00000106069 | ENSMUSG00000004633 |
| UniProt | P52757 | Q80XD1 |
| RefSeq (mRNA) | NM_001039936; NM_001293069; NM_001293070; NM_001293071; NM_001293072 NM_001293073; NM_001293075; NM_001293076; NM_001293077; NM_001293078; NM_001293079; NM_001293080; NM_001293081; NM_004067; NM_001398427 | NM_001163640; NM_023543; NM_001311133; NM_001311134 |
| RefSeq (protein) | NP_001035025; NP_001279998; NP_001279999; NP_001280000; NP_001280001 NP_001280002; NP_001280004; NP_001280005; NP_001280006; NP_001280007; NP_001280008; NP_001280009; NP_001280010; NP_004058 | NP_001157112; NP_001298062; NP_001298063; NP_076032 |
| Location (UCSC) | n/a | Chr 6: 54.02 – 54.28 Mb |
| PubMed search |
- Wikidata
| View/Edit Human | View/Edit Mouse |

Chimerin 2 (beta-chimaerin) is a protein that in humans is encoded by the CHN2 gene.

This gene is a member of the chimerin family and encodes a protein with a phorbol-ester/diacylglycerol-type zinc finger, a Rho-GAP domain and an SH2 domain. This protein has GTPase-activating protein activity that is regulated by phospholipid binding and binding of diacylglycerol (DAG) induces translocation of the protein from the cytosol to the Golgi apparatus membrane. The protein plays a role in the proliferation and migration of smooth muscle cells. Decreased expression of this gene is associated with high-grade gliomas and breast tumors, and increased expression of this gene is associated with lymphomas. Mutations in this gene have been associated with schizophrenia in men. Alternate transcriptional splice variants, encoding different isoforms, have been characterized.
