= Vehicle inspection in the United States =

By-state vehicle-safety and emissions inspection

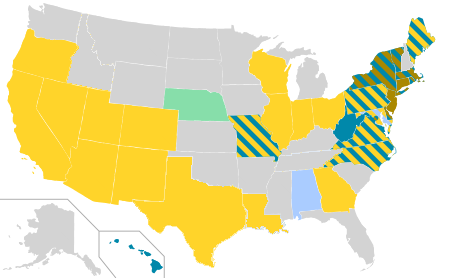
Vehicle inspection laws by state: Periodic safety inspection required VIN inspection required upon sale or transfer Safety inspection required when registering a vehicle from another jurisdiction Emissions testing required in some areas Emissions testing required in all areas No inspection required Striped: Both safety and emissions testing required

In the United States, vehicle safety inspection and emissions inspection are governed by each state individually. Twelve states have a periodic (annual or biennial) safety inspection program, while Maryland requires a safety inspection and Alabama requires a VIN inspection on sale or transfer of vehicles which were previously registered in another state. Maryland also requires a safety inspection prior to the sale or transfer of ownership of a pre-owned vehicle. Seven states require periodic emissions inspections statewide, and eighteen additional states require periodic emissions inspections only for vehicles registered in heavily-polluted areas.

In 1977, the federal Clean Air Act was amended by Congress to require states to implement vehicle emissions inspection programs, known as I/M programs (for Inspection and Maintenance), in all major metropolitan areas whose air quality failed to meet certain federal standards. New York's program started in 1982, California's program (Smog Check) started in 1984, and Illinois's program started in 1986. The Clean Air Act of 1990 required some states to enact vehicle emissions inspection programs. States impacted were those with metropolitan areas where air quality did not meet federal standards. Some states, including Kentucky and Minnesota, have discontinued their testing programs in recent years with approval from the federal government.

== List of jurisdictions ==
=== Require periodic vehicle safety inspections ===
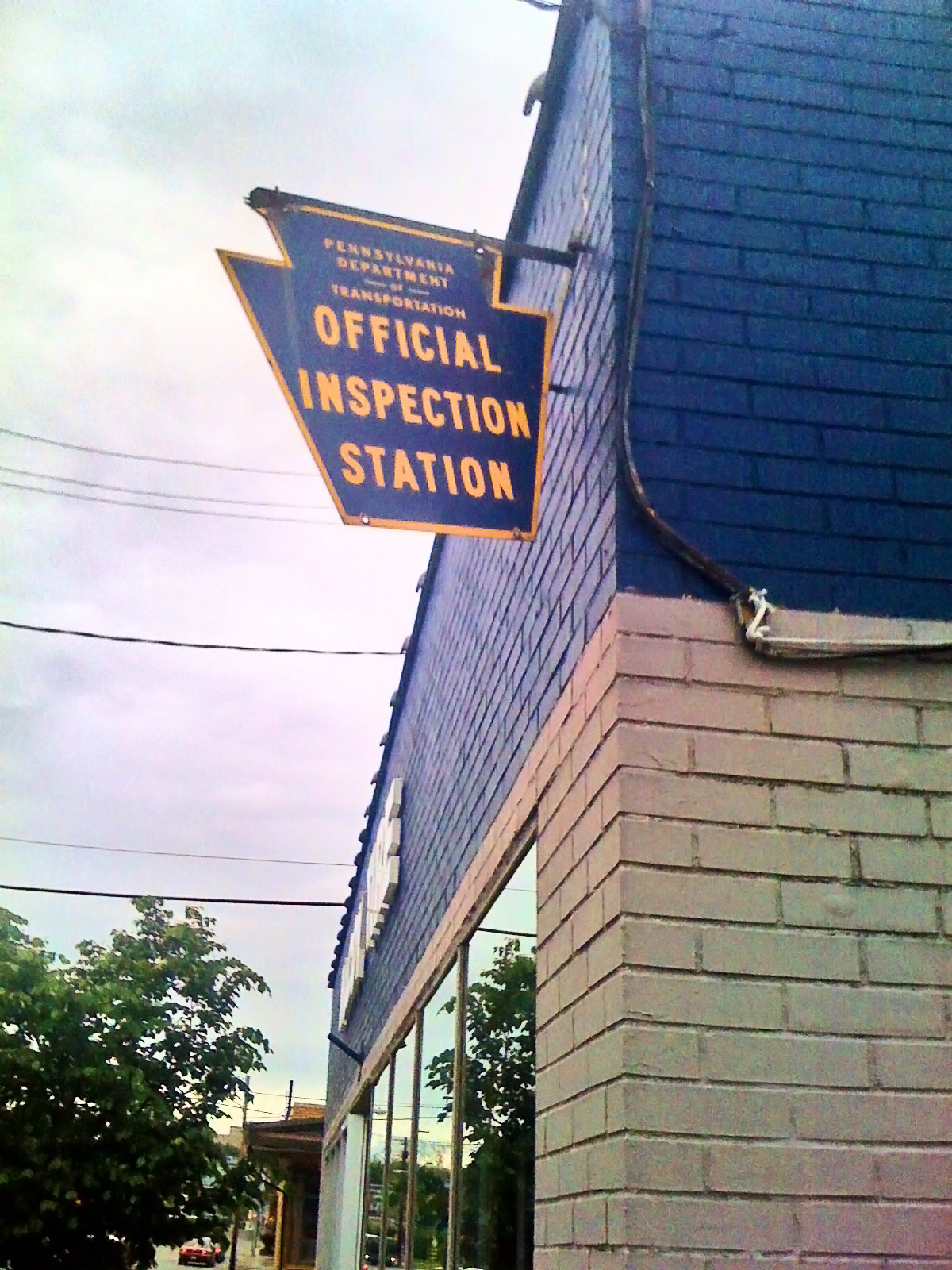
PennDOT-issued sign at an auto garage in New Castle, Pennsylvania stating that it does vehicle inspections for cars

- Connecticut – not for passenger vehicles, but annually for certain commercial vehicles, trucks, grey market, salvage, and several types of trailers.
- Delaware – annually or biennially, new cars are exempt from inspection for the first seven years provided the car remains with the same owner.
- District of Columbia — annually for commercial vehicles and every six months for for-hire vehicles, the requirement for safety inspection for privately owned cars ended October 1, 2009.
- Hawaii – annually, with the following exceptions: Brand new vehicles receive an inspection valid for two years. Emergency vehicles, school vehicles, rental cars, and vehicles used in public transportation must be inspected every six months. Sticker placed on rear bumper to right on license plate.
- Louisiana – effectively no longer required for personal vehicles as of June 30, 2026. Inspection stickers (known locally as "brake tags") are set to be officially replaced with QR codes beginning on January 1, 2027. Commercial trucks, school buses, and certain farming vehicles will still be required to undergo safety inspections even after the new state system takes effect.
- Maine – annually. Color of sticker changes annually. School buses are inspected every six months. Vehicles registered as Antique Autos are exempt. Sticker placed in top center of windshield behind rear view mirror or lower left-hand corner of windshield.
- Massachusetts – annually. Stickers are placed in the lower right corner of the windshield.
- Missouri – biennially, based on the vehicle's model year. Odd-numbered model year renews in odd-numbered year, even-numbered model year renews in even-numbered year. Effective August 28, 2019, motor vehicles for the first ten years following the model year of manufacture and having less than 150,000 miles on the odometer are exempt from the safety inspection requirement. Vehicles displaying historical plates are completely exempt from inspection.
- New Jersey – annually for commercial vehicles (including taxis, limousines, jitneys, and buses), effective January 1, 2010. Passenger vehicles are exempt from safety inspections, effective August 1, 2010.
- New York – annually. Color of sticker changes annually. Newly registered vehicles with a current inspection sticker from another state are exempt until the out-of-state sticker expires or for one year after registration in New York, whichever is sooner. Vehicles registered as farm vehicles are exempt. Stickers are placed on the lower left corner of windshield.
- North Carolina – annually until the vehicle is 30 years of age, at which point inspections are no longer required.
- Pennsylvania – annually for most vehicles; every six months for school vehicles (including school buses and school vans), motor coaches, mass transit buses, etc. Stickers are placed on the lower driver's side corner (bottom Left-Front (LF) A-pillar) of the windshield. Vehicles bearing antique vehicle license plates are exempt from inspection, but vehicles bearing classic or collectible license plates are subject to inspection. Trailers in excess of 3,000 pounds (1,400 kg) GVW are also inspected annually as are motorcycles.
- Rhode Island – biennially; newly registered vehicles are exempt from the inspection requirement for two years from the date of purchase. Vehicles registered as antiques are subject to safety inspection, but are exempt from emissions testing. Stickers are placed on lower-right corner of windshield.
- Vermont – annually; inspections are due at the end of even-numbered months only. Inspections performed in an odd-numbered month will receive a sticker for the next even-numbered month (e.g., a car inspected in November 2011 will receive a sticker good until December 31, 2012). Inspection stickers are placed on the lower left of windshield
- Virginia – annually. Newly registered vehicles with a valid inspection from another state are not exempt from inspection until the out-of-state inspection expires. As soon as a vehicle is registered in Virginia, that vehicle must have a Virginia safety inspection. Before 2019, the inspection sticker was yellow; the background color of the year digits changed annually. The sticker is placed in the lower left part of the windshield (lower center part of the windshield before January 1, 2018). Beginning January 2019, the color of Virginia's inspection stickers changed from yellow to blue. The sticker color changes annually. As of 2026. Virginia's inspection stickers have a holographic state seal, a dogwood flower design, and QR codes to make counterfeiting much more difficult.
- West Virginia – biennially as of 1/1/2024; color of sticker changes biennially; sticker placed in lower left corner of windshield.

=== Require safety inspection only prior to sale of a pre-owned vehicle or transfer of ownership ===
- Alabama – VIN only

=== Require safety inspection only when bringing vehicle from another jurisdiction ===
- Kentucky
- Nebraska

=== Require safety inspection only prior to sale of a pre-owned vehicle or transfer of ownership, or when bringing vehicle from another jurisdiction ===
- Maryland – when registering vehicles from another state. When a used vehicle is purchased.

=== Require periodic vehicle emissions inspections ===
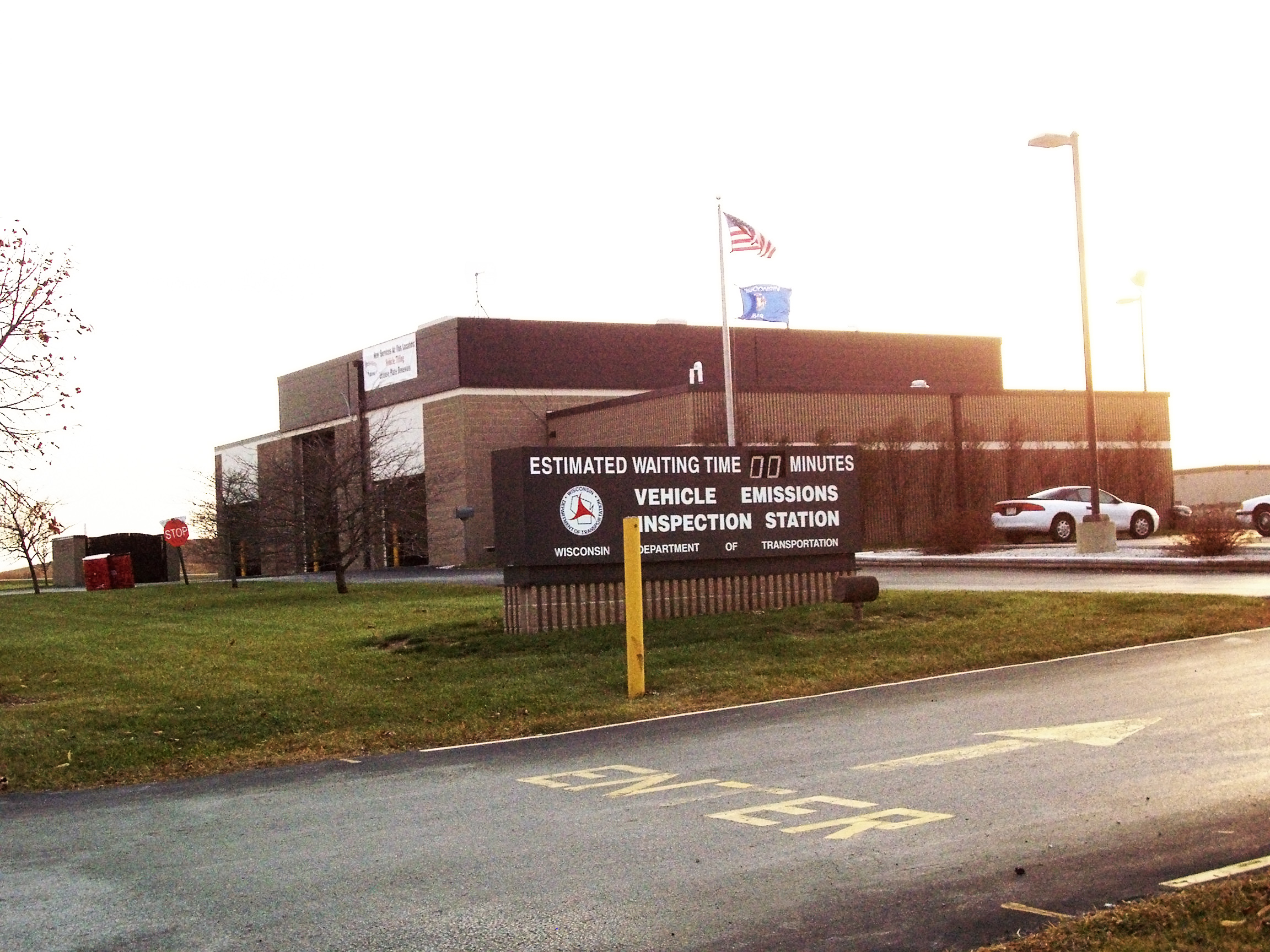
Vehicle emissions inspection station in Wisconsin

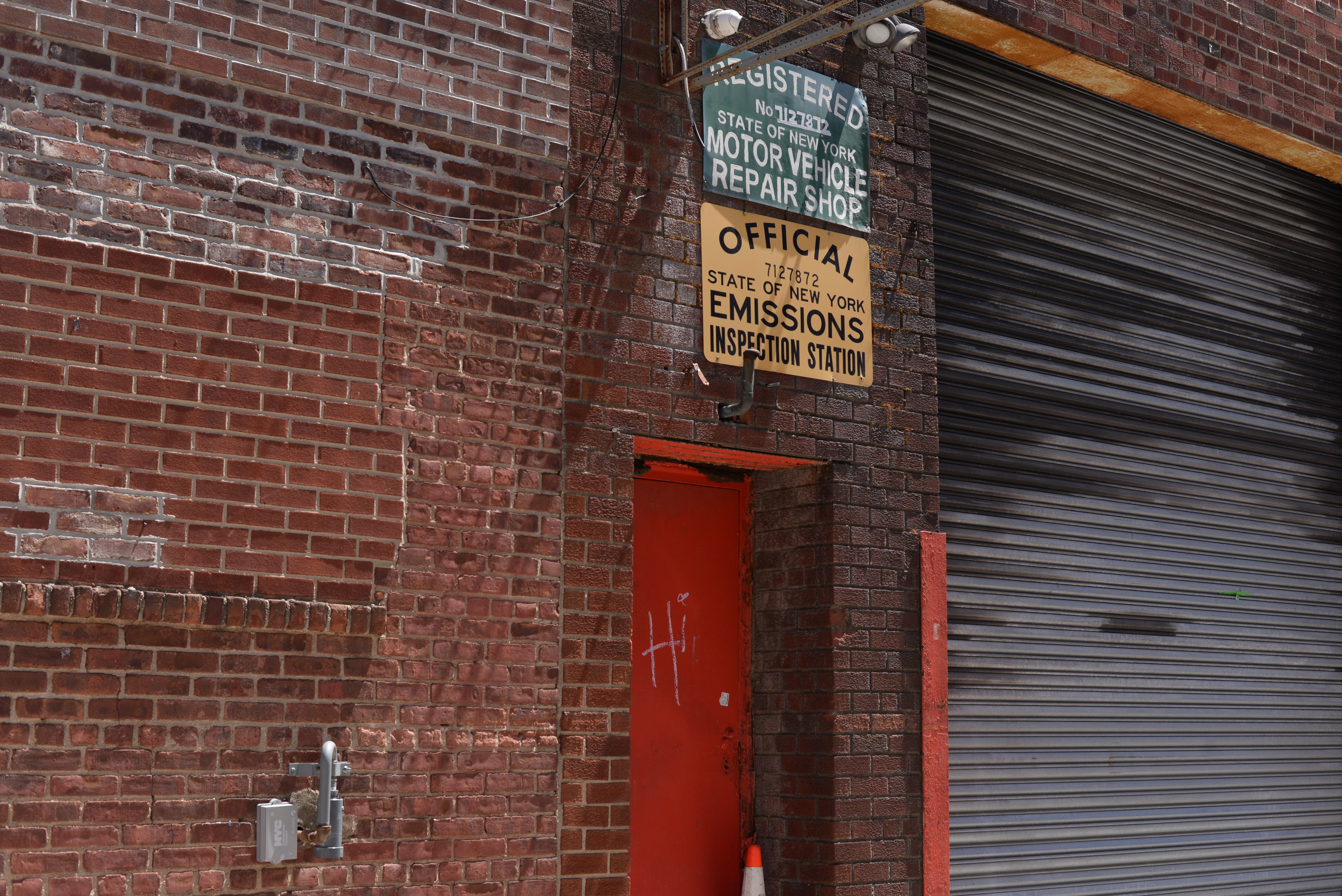
Repair shop in Long Island City, NY, which does official emissions inspections

- Arizona – biennially, in Phoenix and Tucson metro areas only or who commute to both metro areas, depending on age and type of vehicle. Vehicles less than 5 years old, electric vehicles, motorcycles, mopeds, vehicles registered or operated outside of Phoenix and Tucson (including not commuting to these two metro areas), vehicles registered under the IRP, vehicles registered as collectible with collectible-car insurance like those rare or limited production vehicles, or cars that are more than 15 years old and vehicles manufactured pre-1967 are exempt from emissions testing.
- California – biennially for all vehicles from out-of-state, regardless of age; and all vehicles made after 1975 and diesel-powered vehicles made after 1997 which are more than eight years old in all or some zip codes in 41 out of 58 counties require it. Vehicles that are operated in rural areas and counties that do not require smog checks (unless if it's brand-new vehicle or transfer of ownership). Vehicles that are in case of transfer of ownership between family members (husband/wife, siblings, children or grandchildren, grandparents ..etc) or domestic, natural gas-powered vehicles with a GVWR of more than 14,000lbs, specialty-constructed vehicles older than 1975 and electric vehicles are exempt from smog checks.
- Colorado – biennially, except for vehicles seven years old and newer or diesel-powered vehicles four years old and newer. Required in Boulder, Broomfield, Denver, Douglas, and Jefferson Counties, and parts of Adams, Arapahoe, Larimer, and Weld Counties. Motorcycles, vehicles that are pre-1975 and registered as collector's item, horseless carriages, street rods, kit cars and electric cars are exempt from emissions testing. (NOTE: vehicles over 32 years old with collector plates are not exempt from emissions testing and they need to be emissions tested every 5 years, with addition of mileage restriction less than 4,500 miles. Unless if it's grandfathered-in before 1 September 2009) .
- Connecticut – biennially, brand-new cars that are under 4 years old, vehicles that are 25 years old or older, vehicles with a GVWR of over 10,000lbs, motorcycles, mopeds, EVs and composite vehicles are exempt from emissions testing.
- Delaware – annually or biennially. Older cars registered as antiques or classics, motorcycles, mopeds, electric vehicles, diesel-powered Vehicles made before 1998 and Vehicles of model year 1967 or older are exempt from emissions testing.
- District of Columbia – biennially. brand-new cars that are under 4 years old, diesel vehicles, motorcycles, historic vehicles, electric vehicles that are designated as ZEVs (Zero-emission vehicles) and vehicles of model year 1967 or older do not require an emissions testing.
- Georgia – annually for gasoline-powered cars or light-duty trucks (8,500 pounds GVWR or less), required only in the 13 metro Atlanta counties (Cherokee, Clayton, Cobb, Coweta, DeKalb, Douglas, Fayette, Forsyth, Fulton, Gwinnett, Henry, Paulding and Rockdale). The three most recent model year vehicles and those that are 25 model years or older are exempt from emissions testing, as well as all motorcycles, recreational vehicles (RVs), motor homes and diesel-powered vehicles.
- Idaho – no longer required as of July 2023.
- Illinois – biennially after the vehicle is four years old. Required only in the Chicago metropolitan area and eastern suburbs of St. Louis, Missouri. Vehicles manufactured before 1968 as well as vehicles manufactured before 1996 that were grandfathered-in (in compliance with Illinois vehicle emissions laws in 2007), motorcycles, mopeds, diesel-powered vehicles, electric vehicles, kit cars, and vehicles that are registered as antiques, expanded-use antique, street rods and farm vehicles are exempt from emissions testing.
- Indiana – biennially, required in Lake County and Porter County (Chicago metropolitan area)/Northwest Indiana only. Vehicles made pre-1976, diesel and electric vehicles, motorcycles and mopeds, antique, show cars that are over 25 years old and kit cars are exempt from emissions testing.
- Louisiana – annually, only in the Baton Rouge ozone nonattainment area, which consists of the parishes of Ascension, East Baton Rouge, Iberville, Livingston, and West Baton Rouge. Cars registered in these five parishes must be inspected in one of the five parishes; cars from outside those parishes (excluding the cities of New Orleans, Kenner and Westwego) may be inspected in the Baton Rouge area. Emission testing applies only to gasoline-powered vehicles having a gross vehicle weight rating of 10,000 pounds or less.
- Maine – annually, only in Cumberland County. Tractors, trucks that are used for farm, fish, wood or operated in islands, low-speed vehicles, antique vehicles that are over 35 years old or over 25 years old if they're grandfathered-in before 2025 as well as street rods, diesel-powered vehicles with a GVWR less than 18,000lbs, mopeds and motorized bicycles, electric vehicles, experimental vehicles and certain other vehicles are exempt from emissions testing in Maine.
- Maryland – biennially, required in 13 (out of 23) counties and the independent city of Baltimore. The most recent two model years of vehicles, motorcycles, farm trucks, historic vehicles, heavy duty vehicles, kit cars and vehicles of model year 1995 or older are exempt from emissions testing.
- Massachusetts – annually, as of 2008. Vehicles less than 15 years old must pass an OBD-2 scan for emissions system compliance. Vehicles over 15 years old receive a visual check and must not 'produce visible smoke'. Prior to 2008, an emissions inspection was required biennially based on the vehicle's model year (odd-numbered model years were inspected in odd-numbered years, even-numbered model years were inspected in even-numbered years). Also in 2008, the tailpipe test for 1995 model year and older vehicles was discontinued.
- Missouri – biennially, based on the vehicle's model year, required only in St. Louis City, St. Louis County, St. Charles County, and Jefferson County. Historic vehicles, motorcycles, mopeds, any vehicle with a GVWR of over 8.500lbs, electric vehicles, vehicles driven less than 12,000 miles between biennial safety inspections, and vehicles of model year 1995 or older do not require an emissions testing.
- Nevada – required only in the urban areas of Clark County (Las Vegas) and Washoe County (Reno) for most vehicles. New vehicles in their first through third years of registration, hybrid vehicles five model years old or less, fleet vehicles registered in the continuous monitoring program, case of transfer of ownership between husband and wife, transfers of ownership where the last test was within 90 days, diesel vehicles with a gross vehicle weight of 14,001 lb. or more, 1967 or older vehicles, motorcycles/mopeds, replica vehicle registration, and certain other vehicles like alternative-fuel vehicles, electric vehicles as well as vehicles registered as Classic Rod, Classic Vehicle, or Old Timer are exempt from emissions testing.
- New Jersey – biennially. Effective January 1, 2010, commercial vehicles (including taxis, limousines, jitneys, and buses) are subject to an annual inspection. Effective August 1, 2010, new non-commercial vehicles are exempt for the first five years. Used non-commercial vehicles are also exempt for the first five model years, as indicated on the New Car Dealer inspection decal. Used non-commercial vehicles originally purchased outside of New Jersey will receive a decal valid for five years from the model year of the vehicle. Effective August 1, 2010, vehicles exempt from inspection include motorcycles, non-commercial diesel vehicles between 8,500 pounds (3,900 kg) and 10,000 pounds (4,500 kg) GVWR or older than model year 1997 and under 8,500 pounds (3,900 kg) GVWR, diesel trucks between 10,000 pounds (4,500 kg) and 18,000 pounds (8,200 kg) GVWR (subject to self-inspection), farm vehicles, collector vehicles, historic vehicles, trailers, and mopeds. Effective May 2016, gasoline-powered cars 1995 and older as well as gasoline-powered medium-duty vehicles 2007 and older (with a GVWR between 8,500lbs to 14,000lbs) and gasoline-powered heavy-duty vehicles 2013 and older (with a GVWR over 14,000lbs) are no longer subject to emissions inspection. (NOTE: for those registered only as passenger vehicles, commercial-registered ones are not exempt from the emissions testing.) Sticker is placed on the lower left corner of windshield.
- New Mexico – biennially, required only for vehicles 35 model years and newer registered in, or commuting to Bernalillo County (which includes the state's largest city of Albuquerque). Vehicles over 35 years old, diesel-powered vehicles, motorcycles, vehicles with a GVWR of more than 10,000lbs, vehicles that are outside of Bernalillo County, vehicles used exclusively for competition (racecars) or not used on highway (private property) as well as electric vehicles are exempt from emissions testing.
- New York – annually. Newly registered vehicles with a current inspection sticker from another state are exempt until the out-of-state sticker expires or for one year after registration in New York, whichever is sooner. Model year 1996 and newer vehicles are subject to an OBD-II emissions inspection, while older cars receive a visual check of emissions components. Until December 31, 2010, vehicles registered in the five boroughs of New York City, as well as on Long Island, in Westchester County or in Rockland County required a tailpipe smog-test if they are not OBD II equipped (they now receive a visual only check of emissions control devices). All OBD II vehicles in those areas (1996 model year or newer, 1997 and newer for diesel) require an OBD II test plus a visual check of emissions components. Any vehicle 26 model years old or more does not require an emissions check of any sort, and vehicles 2 model years old or newer are exempt. Diesel trucks over 8500 lbs. GVWR are required to have a diesel emissions inspection if they are registered in the NYC metropolitan area.
- North Carolina – annually, required for vehicles in 19 (out of 100) counties, for vehicles newer than 20 years old but more than 3 years old/70,000 miles in 18 counties (Only in Mecklenburg County for vehicles newer than 20 years old but older than 2017 model year vehicles). Farm vehicles, antique vehicles, diesel-powered vehicles, and vehicles with a GVWR over 8,500lbs are exempt from emissions testing. Effective November 1, 2008, no inspection decal is issued upon passing. All state inspection records both emissions and safety are now kept via electronic database, and are required for being awarded new license plates, and/or registration. Effective April 1, 2015, vehicles that are within the last three model years (including the current model year) and have fewer than 70,000 miles on the odometer are exempt from emissions inspection. North Carolina is also trying to get rid of emissions testing by removing it in 18 counties in May/June 2026, except for one county which is in Mecklenburg County, which includes the state's largest city of Charlotte.
- Ohio – currently required only in the Cleveland metropolitan area (Cuyahoga County, Geauga County, Lake County, Lorain County, Medina County, Portage County, and Summit County). Vehicles up to six years old for gasoline/diesel-powered vehicles and hybrid vehicles up to seven years old as well as vehicles over 25 years old are exempt. Testing is based on an odd-even year system. Cars purchased in 2000 were not required to be tested until 2010, while cars purchased in 2003 had to be tested in 2009. Ohio does not charge a fee for emission testing, due to Ohio's tobacco settlement. Ohio is also in process to getting rid of the E-check program by waiver if it's approved by the EPA due to the state costs.
- Oregon – biennially. Required only (1975 and newer) in the Portland metro area and (20 years old and newer) in the Medford metro area, diesel vehicles with a GVWR of over 8,500lbs, motorcycles, mopeds, low-speed vehicles, electric vehicles, and brand new cars less than 4 years old are exempt from emissions testing.
- Pennsylvania – annually for most vehicles under 9,000 pounds (4,100 kg) GVW. Required in 25 (out of 67) counties. Diesel-powered vehicles, vehicles that are made pre-1975, electric vehicles, motorcycles, vehicles that are driven less than 5,000 miles between annual safety inspections, vehicles that are registered antiques, expanded-use antiques, classics and street rods are exempt from emissions inspection.
- Rhode Island – biennially. Brand-new cars less than 2 years old or less than 24,000 miles, vehicles 25 years old and older but still subject to safety inspection, antique vehicles, electric vehicles and farm vehicles are exempt from emissions testing.
- Texas – annually for the following counties: Brazoria, Collin, Dallas, Denton, El Paso, Ellis, Fort Bend, Galveston, Harris, Johnson, Kaufman, Montgomery, Parker, Rockwall, Tarrant, Travis, and Williamson. Bexar County will begin requiring emissions tests in 2026. Vehicles more than 2 model years old and up to 24 model years old are subjected to the annual emission tests (pre-OBDII automobiles registered in the Houston Metro area and DFW Metroplex are tested using the accelerated simulation mode while four-wheel drive/all wheel drive automobiles, light trucks, vans, and SUVs over 8500GVW, continue to use the two-speed idle test (Travis/Williamson and El Paso Counties use the TSI test for pre-1996) – anything over 25 model years old – including those registered as an antique or classic, are exempted from emission testing. Motorcycles and diesel vehicles are exempt from any state emissions testing. As of 2021, pre-OBDII emissions testing is obsolete in the State of Texas.
- Utah – All vehicles registered in Davis, Salt Lake, Utah and Weber counties with model years less than six years old are required to have an emission test once every two years and Vehicles with model years six years old and older (to 1967) must have an emission test every year. Emission certificates are not required for vehicles with model years 1967 or older or diesel vehicles with model years 1997 or older. All vehicles registered in Cache County with model years six years old and greater that have even-numbered model years, must have an emission test in even number years, and vehicles with odd-numbered model years must have an emission test in odd-numbered years. Vehicles with model years 1995 or older or medium-duty vehicles over 8,500lbs with model years 2007 or older do not require an emission test, in all of these counties. Diesel vehicles manufactured before 1998 or weighing more than 14,000lbs (except for Salt Lake County where depends on GVWR like less than 14,000lbs = pre-1998, or over 14,000lbs = pre-2014), electric vehicles, street rods, vehicles registered vintage or custom vehicles that are over 30 years old, vehicles registered as off-highway vehicles or farm-vehicles (Implements of husbandry) and motorcycles are exempt from emissions testing.
- Vermont – annually, done at time of State Inspection 1996 and new with OBDII, some cars are exempt like those 16 years old or older, vehicles with a GVWR of over 10,000lbs, motorcycles, moped, electric vehicles, antique and exhibition vehicles do not have to be emissions tested
- Virginia – biennially, in conjunction with registration renewal, required only in urban and suburban jurisdictions in Northern Virginia. Newly registered vehicles with a valid inspection from another state are NOT exempt from inspection until the out-of-state inspection expires. A vehicle registered in Virginia must have a Virginia safety inspection. Vehicles 25-years old or older or those registered as antique vehicles, brand-new vehicles 4 years old and newer, gasoline-powered vehicles with a GVWR of over 10,000lbs, diesel-powered vehicles that are made pre-1997 (less than 8,500lbs) or diesel-powered vehicles with a GVWR of over 8,500lbs, motorcycles, mopeds, autocycles, electric vehicles and qualified hybrid vehicles that are over 50 MPG fuel economy (but still subject to $2 per emissions fee) and alternative-fuel vehicles are exempt from emissions testing.
- Wisconsin – biennially, required only in Kenosha County, Milwaukee County, Ozaukee County, Racine County, Sheboygan County, Washington County, and Waukesha County. Vehicles manufactured before 1996, brand-new vehicles that are less than 6 years old, diesel-powered vehicles manufactured before 2006, collector vehicles that are 20 years old and older, heavy duty vehicles with a GVWR of over 14,000lbs and electric vehicles are exempt from testing.

=== Require VIN inspection ===
- California – Required when registering an out-of-state vehicle
- Colorado – Required when registering an out-of-state vehicle
- Connecticut – Required when registering an out-of-state vehicle
- Delaware - Required when registering an out-of-state vehicle
- Florida – Required when registering an out-of-state vehicle
- Idaho – Required when registering an out-of-state vehicle
- Illinois – The main VIN tag is inspected at emissions testing stations. If the VIN tag is not acceptable or is missing, the vehicle is "rejected" for emissions testing. Emissions testing is required biennially only for vehicles registered in specific counties and zip codes (see above).
- Indiana – required when registering an out of state vehicle
- Kansas – Required when registering an out-of-state vehicle
- Kentucky – Required when registering an out-of-state vehicle
- Maine – Required to match VIN with registration as part of the annual safety inspection. A tracing verification of the VIN is not part of the inspection.
- Missouri – Required when registering an out-of-state vehicle
- Montana - Required when titling a vehicle with no title but a clean VIN report. Only to verify the VIN matches the bill of sale for vehicles with no title.
- Nebraska – Required when registering an out-of-state, rebuilt, or salvage title vehicle
- Nevada – Required when registering an out-of-state vehicle for the first time in the state
- New Mexico – Required when registering an out-of-state vehicle
- Ohio – Required when registering an out-of-state vehicle
- Oklahoma – Required when registering an out-of-state vehicle
- Oregon – Required when registering an out-of-state or new-to-Oregon vehicle.
- Pennsylvania – Required as part of the annual safety inspection. The inspection procedure only requires checking the main VIN tag. A tracing or visual verification of the VIN by an inspection mechanic or notary is also required when registering an out-of-state vehicle.
- Rhode Island – Required when registering an out-of-state vehicle
- Tennessee - Required when registering vehicles with salvage titles that have been declared rebuilt.
- Texas – Required when registering an out-of-state vehicle; however, the VIN is inspected as part of the required safety inspection, so no additional effort is required.
- Utah - Required when registering an out-of-state vehicle
- Vermont – Required when registering out-of-state vehicle
- Washington – Required only when registering an out-of-state vehicle for the first time in the state, or for rebuilt vehicles
- Wyoming – Required when registering an out-of-state vehicle

=== No safety, emissions, or VIN inspections ===
- Alaska
- Arkansas
- Iowa
- Michigan
- Minnesota
- Mississippi
- Montana
- New Hampshire
- North Dakota
- South Carolina
- South Dakota

== Non-commercial vehicles ==
State	Periodic safety inspections	Periodic emissions inspections
Alabama	no	no
Alaska	no	no
Arizona	no	biennially for Phoenix and Tucson metros
Arkansas	no	no
California	no	biennially for cars from out-of-state or in-state cars 7 or more years old in all or some zip codes in 41 of 58 counties (see California Smog Check Program)
Colorado	no	biennially in all or parts of 9 out of 64 counties, except for vehicles 7 model years old and newer
Connecticut	no	biennially
Delaware	biennially	biennially
District of Columbia	no	biennially
Florida	no	no
Georgia	no	annually for Atlanta metro
Hawaii	annually	no
Idaho	no	no – (since July 1, 2023)
Illinois	no	biennially for Chicago and St. Louis metros (1996 model year and newer)
Indiana	no	biennially for Lake and Porter counties
Iowa	no	no
Kansas	no	no
Kentucky	no	no
Louisiana	annually (Note: New Orleans requires a "brake tag". In addition to the state requirements, if the vehicle is registered in New Orleans, the brakes must be tested annually with a short stop test.)/biennially	annually for Baton Rouge metro
Maine	annually	annually (for Cumberland County only)
Maryland	no	biennially for 13 of 23 counties and Baltimore
Massachusetts	annually	annually
Michigan	no	no
Minnesota	no	no
Mississippi	no	no
Missouri	biennially	biennially for St. Louis metro
Montana	no	no
Nebraska	no	no
Nevada	no	annually for urban areas of Clark and Washoe counties for most vehicles
New Hampshire	no	no
New Jersey	biennially, as per njmvc.gov	exempt for first five years, then biennially
New Mexico	no	biennially for Bernalillo county only
New York	annually	annually
North Carolina	annually	annually for 19/100 counties
North Dakota	no	no
Ohio	no	odd/even for Cleveland metro
Oklahoma	no	no
Oregon	no	yes for Portland and Medford metros
Pennsylvania	annually	annually in 25 of 67 counties
Rhode Island	biennially	biennially
South Carolina	no	no
South Dakota	no	no
Tennessee	no	no – (since February 5, 2022)
Texas	no	annually for large urban areas Bexar County (San Antonio) emissions testing beginning on November 1, 2026
Utah	no	yes for five subjected counties
Vermont	annually	annually
Virginia	annually	biennially for urban and suburban northern Virginia
Washington	no	no – (since Jan 1, 2020)
West Virginia	biennially	no
Wisconsin	no	biennially for select counties
Wyoming	no	no

== See also ==
- Vehicle inspection
- Under vehicle inspection
- Automobile safety
