= Fetal protein =

Fetal proteins are high levels of proteins present during the fetal stage of development. Often related proteins assume similar roles after birth or in the embryo, in which case the fetal varieties are called fetal isoforms. Sometimes, the genes coding fetal isoforms occur adjacent to their adult homologues in the genome, and in those cases a locus control region often coordinates the transition from fetal to adult forms. In other cases fetal isoforms can be produced by alternate splicing using fetal exons to produce proteins that differ in only a portion of their amino acid sequence. In some situations the continuing expression of fetal forms can reveal the presence of a disease condition or serve as a treatment for diseases such as sickle cell anemia. Some well known examples include:

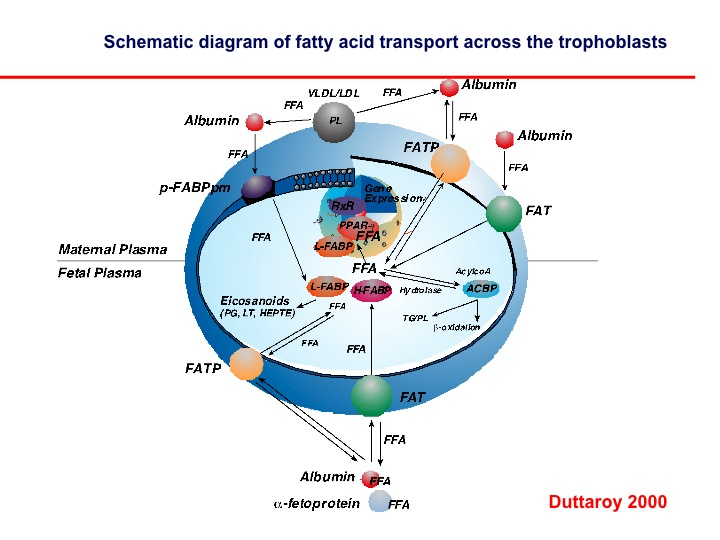
Transport of Fatty Acids During Gestation

- Alpha-fetoprotein (AFP), the predominant serum protein of the fetus which gives way to albumin in the adult. AFP is categorized as an oncofetal protein because it is also found in tumors.
- Fetal hemoglobin, the fetal version of hemoglobin.
- Fetal Troponin T and Troponin I isoforms.

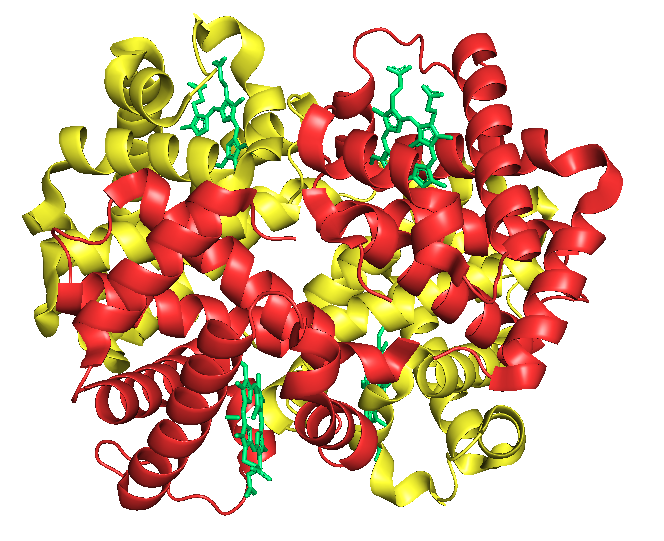
Structure of Fetal Hemoglobin

Fetal Hemoglobin is a member of erythrocytes called F-cells. It is a tetramer protein with 2 alpha and 2 gamma subunits. This is different from adult hemoglobin because it has 2 alpha and 2 beta subunits. Fetal hemoglobin is coded by a gene on chromosome 11. The gamma subunit on fetal hemoglobin contains a neutral and nonpolar amino acid at position 136, unlike the beta subunit of adult hemoglobin. The protein has a different structure than the adult protein because of this and helps in fetal development. Fetal hemoglobin has a main function to transfer oxygen from the pregnant person to the fetus during gestation. Fetal hemoglobin is vital in this system because it has a high affinity for oxygen. Fetal hemoglobin can be used to screen for pregnancy complications in the fetus and pregnant person. Fetal hemoglobin can also be used to treat sickle cell anemia. This hemoglobin is less likely to be affected by the disease because it has a higher affinity for oxygen. Hydroxyurea is used to increase the amount of fetal hemoglobin in an adult. The fetal hemoglobin levels drop within 6 months of birth. Higher levels past 6 months can indicate blood diseases like thalassemia, leukemia, and sickle cell anemia. Thalassemia is a blood condition where the blood cells do not carry enough oxygen. Leukemia is a cancer of the blood and sickle cell anemia is a condition where red blood cells don’t carry enough oxygen and collapse into a sickle cell shape. Fetal hemoglobin can also be found in the cord blood of the umbilical cord. The higher oxygen affinity allows more oxygen to transfer from the pregnant person to the fetus more efficiently. Common blood disorders with high levels of fetal hemoglobin show symptoms like anemia.

Fetal Troponin T is a cardiac protein found in adults and infants. There are 4 Troponin T (TnT) isoforms found in fetal cardiac muscle. TnT1 and TnT2 which are also found in adult cardiac muscle. TnT1 are present along with two other isoforms. One of the other isoforms, a fetal cardiac TnT isoform, is also found in the fetal skeletal muscle. These isoforms are expressed differently in the fetus than in adult cardiac muscle.

Fetal Troponin I (TnI) is a cardiac and skeletal protein found in adults and infants, with isomers specific to each. Two isoforms, TnIs and TnIc were found, with TnIs being more predominant during development. TnIc is the isoform found more in adults. TnIs levels decrease after birth and TnIc becomes the more predominant isoform in adults.

α-FetoProtein (AFP) is part of the α1 globulin family of proteins. Alpha globulins are round transport proteins that have a wide variety of functions. Human AFP is produced in the liver, yolk sac, and GI tract of a fetus and dispersed into plasma. The mother of the fetus also obtains AFP directly from the fetus. AFP was first found in human fetal serum in 1965 and determined to be the fetal version of albumin. In the 1980s a study found that fetal size and gestational age affects the concentration of AFP and that maternal, venous, and cord arterial AFP are associated with each other. Low AFP levels were found to show a lower risk pregnancy and high AFP determined that a pregnancy was higher risk along with other factors. The gene that codes for AFP on chromosome 4 is related to the genes that code for albumin, and all of them are clustered on the chromosome together. The AFP gene includes a promoter, 3 enhancers, and 2 silencers that assist in the regulation of AFP. Enhancers are blocked after birth to stop AFP production and to instead assist the albumin gene. This protein resembles albumin and is the main protein found in fetal serum. Human AFP is coded by a gene on chromosome 4, is made up of 591 amino acids and weighs between 68 and 72 kDa. This is a glycoprotein however human AFP only has carbohydrate side chains on one amino acid in the single chain. The protein contains cysteine which can create disulfide bonds, giving it a U- or V-shaped two-dimensional structure by the single chain being folded into loops. The carbohydrate on Human AFP can bind lectin, which is responsible for signaling in cells and immune responses. This can also mark where tumor sites have originated from and bound lectins can be targeted for drug therapy. Lectin affinity electrophoresis can be used to identify tumors due to binding of lectins. AFP can uptake fatty acids which contribute to energy generation and storage, plasma synthesis, and protein anchoring. It can also uptake lipoproteins which carry cholesterol throughout the body. AFP concentrations are abundant in the human fetus but decline after birth. In adults a normal amount of AFP is 0-40nng/mL and high levels of this can indicate diseases, cancer, and fetal defects. In pregnant people AFP levels rise at 14 weeks until 32 weeks, and range between 10 and 150 ng/mL in the middle of gestation. This is why AFP can be used alongside other tests as a tumor marker protein in adults. AFP is a single polypeptide chain with a half-life of 4–5 days. The protein that is normally expressed in a fetus can also be expressed in mesodermal and endodermal tumors. AFP can have a lower concentration with fetal defects and is used as a marker for that. A low AFP in a pregnant person can indicate Down syndrome. There are 3 forms of AFP: L1, L2, and L3. L1 is the form associated most commonly with liver disease and L3 is most commonly associated with malignant tumors. AFP-L3 can be used to detect hepatocellular carcinoma early on when compared to overall AFP levels. Liver cirrhosis can produce more AFP but a concentration over 200 can indicate hepatocellular carcinoma. AFP can also be used to indicate effectiveness of chemotherapy. Some cancers like liver cancer will produce high amounts of AFP because the malignant cells can revert to how fetal cells work. When chemotherapy is effective, the AFP concentration will begin to decline back to normal range, whereas if it is ineffective the concentration won’t decline. Post surgery tests can indicate whether or not the malignant tumors were removed or if there are metastases that were missed. The test to measure concentration of AFP is a blood test. The most common types of cancers AFP indicates are in the liver, ovaries, and testicles. A rare genetic condition called Ataxia Telangiectasia can also result in higher levels of AFP in people.
