= Neuropeptide receptor =

Cell surface receptors that bind specific neuropeptides

A neuropeptide receptor is a type of G protein-coupled receptor (GPCR) that binds neuropeptides—small, protein-like molecules used by neurons to communicate.

Neuropeptides differ from classical neurotransmitters in several key ways:

- active at much lower concentrations
- bind their receptors with higher affinity
- synthesized as large inactive precursors that undergo complex processing.

In contrast, neurotransmitters are typically synthesized through simpler enzymatic pathways, Neuropeptide receptors play crucial roles in modulating neuronal excitability, synaptic transmission, pain perception, mood, appetite, circadian rhythms, and stress responses.

An example is the μ-opioid receptor, which binds to and is activated by the neuropeptide β-endorphin.

== Physiological roles ==
Neuropeptide receptors play a role in a variety of physiological processes:

- Neuronal Circuit Regulation – Modulate excitatory/inhibitory balance (e.g., NPY, VIP, somatostatin). Enhance synaptic plasticity and memory (e.g., galanin, adropin).
- Sensory Processing – Mediate pain, temperature, and auditory signals (e.g., CGRP, substance P, UCN3). Integrate multisensory information for adaptive behaviors.
- Immune and Inflammatory Modulation – Pro-inflammatory activation (CRH, CGRP, substance P). Anti-inflammatory effects (VIP, NPY, α-MSH).
- Metabolic and Endocrine Regulation – Regulate appetite and energy balance (e.g., ghrelin, 26RFa, GLP-1). Facilitate communication between the brain, gut, and liver.
- Neuroprotection and Neurodegeneration – Protect neurons in stroke, epilepsy, and Alzheimer’s (e.g., NPY, dynorphin). Impact processes in diseases like Parkinson’s and Huntington’s.
- Pain and Stress Response – Opioid receptors mediate analgesia and stress (μ, δ, κ). Non-classical receptors modulate opioid peptide functions (e.g., NMDA-R, Mas-related GPCRs).
- Behavioral and Emotional Regulation – Influence social bonding, fear, addiction, and anxiety (e.g., oxytocin, vasopressin, CRH).

== See also ==
- Neurotransmitter receptor
