= Steroid 17alpha-monooxygenase =

steroid 17-alpha-monooxygenase

Identifiers
- EC no.: 1.14.99.9
- CAS no.: 9029-67-8

Databases
- IntEnz: IntEnz view
- BRENDA: BRENDA entry
- ExPASy: NiceZyme view
- KEGG: KEGG entry
- MetaCyc: metabolic pathway
- PRIAM: profile
- PDB structures: RCSB PDB PDBe PDBsum
- Gene Ontology: AmiGO / QuickGO
Search
- PMC: articles
- PubMed: articles
- NCBI: proteins

In enzymology, a steroid 17alpha-monooxygenase (EC 1.14.99.9) is an enzyme that catalyzes the chemical reaction

a steroid + AH_{2} + O_{2} $\rightleftharpoons$ a 17alpha-hydroxysteroid + A + H_{2}O

The 3 substrates of this enzyme are steroid, an electron acceptor AH_{2}, and O_{2}, whereas its 3 products are 17alpha-hydroxysteroid, the reduction product A, and H_{2}O.

This enzyme belongs to the family of oxidoreductases, specifically those acting on paired donors, with O2 as oxidant and incorporation or reduction of oxygen. The oxygen incorporated need not be derive from O miscellaneous. The systematic name of this enzyme class is steroid,hydrogen-donor:oxygen oxidoreductase (17alpha-hydroxylating). Other names in common use include steroid 17alpha-hydroxylase, cytochrome P-45017alpha, cytochrome P-450 (P-45017alpha,lyase), and 17alpha-hydroxylase-C17,20 lyase. This enzyme participates in c21-steroid hormone metabolism. It has 3 cofactors: NADH, NADPH, and Heme.
