= Multiple resistance =

Multiple resistance may refer to:

- Multiple drug resistance
  - including Antimicrobial resistance
- Pesticide resistance § Multiple and cross-resistance
