= Somatomedin receptor =

Cell surface receptors that bind somatomedins

A somatomedin receptor is a receptor which binds the somatomedins (IGFs). Somatomedin is abbreviated to IGF, in reference to insulin-like growth factor.

There are two types:

- Insulin-like growth factor 1 receptor (IGF-1R)
- Insulin-like growth factor 2 receptor (IGF-2R)
