= Signal sequence =

Signal sequence can refer to:

- Signal peptide
- DNA uptake signal sequence
