= Nerve tissue protein =

A nerve tissue protein is a biological molecule related to the function and maintenance of normal nervous tissue. An example would include, for example, the generation of myelin which insulates and protects nerves. These are typically calcium-binding proteins.

== Myelination and peripheral nervous system ==
There are two types of myelin. The first is oligodendrocyte, which can be found in the mammalian Central Nervous System (CNS). The second is Schwann cells, which are found in the Peripheral Nervous System (PNS). Myelination of axons by these Schwann cells are essential for normal nerve function. Peripheral nerves rely on communication between axons and Schwaan cells.

== Maintenance of myelin ==
Prion protein triggers are an important factor in the signals that ensure myelin maintenance and are distinct from those that direct myelination. Prion protein and antibodies POM1 and POM3, which recognize epitopes in the terminus (around amino acids (aa) 140–152) and charged clusters of prion protein (aa95-100) were used to their role in myelin maintenance. The result indicated that neuronal expression and regulated proteolysis of prion protein are essential for myelin maintenance.

=== Neurodegenerative disease ===
Neurodegenerative disease is caused by prions accumulation of PrPsc. The brains of humans or animals affected with prion disease show characteristics histopathological changes. However, the pathogenesis of the disease is largely unknown and treatment is often unsatisfactory. Tests on 60-week-old mice investigated PrPc – deficient mice showed chronic demyelinating polyneuropathy. Chronic demyelinating polyneuropathy was 100% penetrant and conspicuous in all investigated peripheral nerves. Large fibers we affected in axons when morphometry was used and identical pathologies were detected in the sciatic nerves.

== Proteins ==
=== Neuronal apoptosis inhibitory protein ===
Neuronal apoptosis inhibitory protein (NAIP) belongs to the family of proteins called the inhibitor of apoptosis family (IAP), these proteins are one of the key regulators of apoptosis. However, when NAIP use baculovirus IAP-repeat (BIR) domains to interact with caspases, they inhibit otherwise automatic formation of procaspase-9, an apoptosis initiator.

The three-dimensional structure of all BIR domains is constructed of two to three NH2-terminus α-helices, a central antiparallel β-sheet, and two to three carboxy-terminus α-¬helices. IAP-binding motifs (IBMs) are constructed from amino-terminal tetrapeptides. The binding sites of the IBMs are between the last strand of the β-sheet and the nearby α-¬helix. The zinc ion is chelated by one histidine and three cysteines. The NH2-terminus serine binds to IBM-binding groove, P1’. The serine chain (S) is inserted into an amino acid hydrophobic pocket. Once in this pocket, hydrogen bonds attach to the oxygen atom of the serine chain, also the oxygen atom at P1’ forms another hydrogen bond to the tryptophan chain. The tryptophan chain also interacts with the carbon atoms of the arginine at P3’. A backbone of nitrogen and oxygen at P2’ and of nitrogen at P4’ provide stability.

When coexpressed, the presence of both NAIP and hippocalcin caused neuroblastoma cells to be protected from cell death through the induction of increased calcium levels.

NAIP has been shown to be involved in the inherited disease spinal muscular atrophy. The interaction between NAIP and hippocalcin, a neuronal calcium-sensor protein, has been observed to take place in the zinc-binding region along with other specific amino acids. In sympathetic neurons, the expression of NAIP-BIR3 and hippocalcin did not provide any significant protection from cell death from the withdrawal of nerve growth factor. This is unexpected because, in nerve growth factor withdrawal, caspase-3 and -9 are activated, causing cell death, which are the very caspases blocked by NAIP.

=== Hippocalcin ===
Hippocalcin is a neuronal calcium-sensor protein which has two to three regions that can bind with calcium ions.

=== XIAP ===
The X-linked IAP (XIAP) is an extremely powerful inhibitor of apoptosis. This is done through the binding to caspases directly. Similar to the functionality of NAIP, the BIR3 domain of XIAP binds to the carboxyl-terminal subunit of caspase-9. Between S1 and S1’ is where the catalysis occurs. In caspase-3 the ‘hook’ and ‘sinker’ attach. Both the BIR2 and BIR3 have a groove that is predominately negatively charged. This negative charge in BIR3 allows the attachment of the IAP-binding motif, causing enzymatic activity to be inhibited.
When overexpressed, XIAP is able to block caspases extremely well and prevents cell death of sympathetic neurons when nerve growth factors are deprived.

== Types ==
- Agrin
- Chimerin Proteins
- Chromogranins
- Dopamine and cAMP-Regulated Phosphoprotein 32
- Fragile X Mental Retardation Protein
- GAP-43 Protein
- Glucose Transporter Type 3
- Hu Paraneoplastic Encephalomyelitis Antigens
- Microtubule-Associated Proteins
- Myelin Proteins
- Natriuretic Peptide, Brain
- Nerve Growth Factors
- Neuroendocrine Secretory Protein 7B2
- Neurofilament Proteins
- Neurogranin
- Neuronal Apoptosis-Inhibitory Protein
- Neuronal Calcium-Sensor Proteins
- Neuropeptides
- Olfactory Marker Protein
- S100 Proteins
- Synapsins
- Synaptophysin
- Synucleins
- Tubulin
