= Biogenic amine receptor =

Biogenic amine receptor are a variety of neurotransmitter receptors that are sensitive to biogenic amine neurotransmitters. They mostly belong to the G protein-coupled receptor (GPCR) family of transmembrane receptors, specifically within GPCR "Family A" (Rhodopsin-like receptors). A notable exception is the serotonin 5-HT_{3} receptor, which is a ligand-gated ion channel. The biogenic amine receptors include the monoamine receptors.
