= Malpighian corpuscle =

There are at least two anatomical structures called a Malpighian corpuscle. They are also known as:

- Renal corpuscles — the initial filtering component of nephrons in the kidneys
- White pulp, splenic lymphoid nodules, or white nodules — follicles in the white pulp of the spleen, containing many lymphocytes

These structures are named after Marcello Malpighi (1628–1694), an Italian physician and biologist regarded as the father of microscopical anatomy and histology.
