= Misinformation related to menstruation and menopause =

Misinformation related to menstruation and menopause often includes incorrect statements and misleading information pertaining to menstruation, the menstrual cycle, and menopause that can contribute to societal, religious, healthcare, financial inequity for people who menstruate.

== Etiology ==
About 26% of the female population is of reproductive age and a majority of those have menstrual cycles. As menstruating people are present in all societies, taboos regarding menstruation are also prevalent in many societies around the world. Misinformation regarding menstruation primary arise from these taboos, often associating menstrual blood with uncleanliness or placing some spiritual significance on the menstrual cycle itself.

Misinformation around menopause, on the other hand, tends to focus around misconceptions regarding aging, sexual function, and hormone replacement.

== Common misinformation regarding menstruation ==
| Claim | Refutation |
|---|---|
| Menstruation (or menstrual blood) is dirty or dangerous | Menstruation is a natural bodily process that occurs in humans, other primates, and some mammals with female reproductive organs. Menstrual blood is decidualized endometrial tissue that lines the uterus—made up of endometrial epithelial cells, stromal cells, endothelial cells, immune cells, and proteins—which is shed in response to hormonal signals that vary over the course of the menstrual cycle. The endometrial cavity, like most of the human body, has its own microbiome, and in fact is thought to have a substantially lower biomass compared to the vaginal canal. While menstrual blood may be exposed to vaginal flora during transit, there is no inherent danger present in menstrual tissue. |
| Certain foods are off-limits to menstruating women and girls | There is no evidence that dietary restrictions are necessary during menses or that any food eaten will impact menstrual flow. Restricting foods can have a detrimental impact on nutritional intake. |
| Menstruation indicates readiness for marriage and sex | While menarche is one potential biologic indicator of fertility, it is not an indicator that a menstruating person is "ready" for sexual intercourse. Readiness for sexual intercourse is dependent on various biopsychosocial factors, including cognitive and social maturation of the individual. |
| Menstruation limits women's abilities | There is no evidence that menstruation impacts one's mental or physical abilities. A large body of research exists that indicates there is actually no change in a woman's cognitive, physical, or interpersonal abilities during menstruation. |
| Real women menstruate | A variety of reasons exist for why a reproductive-age person may not menstruate. This includes biological causes of abnormal uterine bleeding or amenorrhea, physiologic causes (i.e. polyendocrine metabolic ovarian syndrome (PMOS), thyroid dysfunction, premature ovarian insufficiency, etc), as well as persons who have differences in sex chromosomes (i.e intersex individuals, transgender women, complete androgen insensitivity syndrome, etc). |
| Menstruation should not be discussed publicly; menstruation is a woman's issue | Societal expectations regarding secrecy around menstruation perpetuates ignorance and policy neglect that contributes to systemic healthcare disparities and period poverty. Period poverty contributes to increasing rates of girls and young women dropping out of school in both developed and developing nations. It also makes affording menstrual products a challenge in many parts of the world, including the United States. One method of combating period poverty and menstrual stigmas is having open discussions and creating supportive environments to facilitate societal change. |
| All women are moody when they menstruate | Cyclic fluctuations in the hypothalamic-pituitary-ovarian axis affecting the amount of estrogen and progesterone in the body is thought to contribute to mood symptoms during menstruation. Not every menstruating patient experiences mood fluctuations with menses. Approximately 90% of reproductive-aged women report experiencing at least one premenstrual symptom (which may not be mood symptoms), whereas about 20–30% experience symptoms that are bothersome enough to meet criteria for premenstrual syndrome. About 1% to 5% of menstruating people meet criteria for premenstrual dysphoric disorder (PMDD). |
| Women need to menstruate to clear toxins from the body | Menstrual blood does not containing toxins and therefore does not contribute to de-toxification. Additionally, people may not regularly menstruate if they are on a form of hormonal contraception, and sometimes hormonal contraceptives are used specifically for menstrual suppression. |

== Common misinformation regarding menopause ==
Menopause is defined as 12 consecutive months without a period (in the absence of other potential causes of amenorrhea). This is a natural event that marks the permanent end of menstruation and fertility.

| Claim | Refutation |
|---|---|
| If you're not having hot flashes, then it's not menopause | Hot flashes (also known as vasomotor symptoms of menopause or VSM) are not the only symptom of menopause, though they are very common in the menopausal and perimenopausal period. Additional symptoms may include: changes in menstrual cycle and menstrual bleeding, genitourinary symptoms (e.g. vaginal dryness, irritation, burning with urination, urinary leaking), decline in fertility, change in sexual desire, mood changes, insomnia, brain fog, anxiety, weight gain. |
| You either are or are not in menopause | The transition from pre-menopause to menopause is called the perimenopausal period, which can begin several years before people transition into menopause. People tend to experience symptoms associated with menopause in the perimenopausal period. |
| Menopause doesn't last that long | The average age of menopause in the US is 52, but people can develop perimenopausal symptoms starting as early as their 40s. |
| You can't get pregnant when you're in menopause | While true that once somebody has transitioned to menopause that they are no longer reproductive, people can still be fertile in the perimenopausal period and therefore are capable of becoming pregnant. |
| You should get your hormones tested during perimenopause | Hormone testing (i.e testing levels of estrogen, progesterone, testosterone, etc) is not generally necessary for the diagnosis of perimenopause in the absence of additional concerns. Hormone testing is often an unreliable indicator given that hormone levels fluctuate even more dramatically in the perimenopausal period, people's baseline hormone levels are different and people respond to hormonal fluctuations differently, hormone levels may be artificially different for people on hormone replacement of hormonal contraceptives. Symptoms are generally the most reliable indicator of perimenopause. |
| Hormone replacement therapy (HRT) is dangerous | Risks associated with HRT varies significantly based on the type of HRT used (i.e. estrogen alone for people without a uterus vs combined estrogen and progestin) and the method of delivery (i.e. oral, transdermal, topical, etc.). Briefly, combined hormone therapy is associated with a small risk of heart attack, stroke, deep vein thrombosis (though the latter's effect is significantly reduced if using a topical or transdermal route), while estrogen only therapy is associated with an increased risk of endometrial cancer in people with a uterus. The general consensus amongst experts trained in menopausal treatment is that HRT is considered a safe option in patients without contraindications to HRT use and may confer benefits in terms of bone health and cardiovascular disease. |
| Natural treatments are safer | While plants and herbs have been used in providing relief of menopausal symptoms, there is limited research regarding safety and efficacy of these treatments and these products are not regulated by the Food and Drug Administration to ensure safe ingredients and effective doses of the substances. A 2010 meta-analysis of studies evaluating efficacy of phytoestrogens in management of VSM did not find evidence of benefit when compared to placebo. There is limited research regarding efficacy of Chinese herbal medicine treatments or black cohosh for treatment of VMS. Additionally, liver toxicity associated with black cohosh use and photosensitivity and increased risk of bleeding in patients on warfarin with dong quai use have been reported. |
| HRT will help with all perimenopausal symptoms | HRT is most beneficial for treatment of VMS (hot flashes and night sweats) and vulvovaginal and bladder symptoms. It is less helpful and is not indicated for the prevention of heart disease; brain fog; musculoskeletal changes, hair loss, weight gain, or skin changes associated with normal aging. |
| Hormones are the only treatment option | There are many non-hormonal options for management of vasomotor symptoms, including but not limited to: antidepressants for hot flashes, fezolinetant, gabapentin, clonidine, and selective estrogen receptor modulators. Additionally, vaginal moisturizers and lubricants can be beneficial for vaginal dryness and pain associated with penetrative intercourse. Antidepressants and psychotherapy are also beneficial for mood changes in menopause. Regular exercise helps maintain muscle and bone mass to reduce osteoporosis risk, has been demonstrated to improve mood symptoms, and is beneficial for weight gain in menopause. |
