= KNDy neuron =

Neurons in the hypothalamus central to hormonal control of reproduction

Details
- System: Reproductive system
- Location: Hypothalamus

Kisspeptin, neurokinin B, and dynorphin (KNDy) neurons are neurons in the hypothalamus of the brain that are central to the hormonal control of reproduction.

KNDy neurons in the hypothalamus coexpress kisspeptin, neurokinin B (NKB) and dynorphin. They are involved in the negative feedback of gonadotropin-releasing hormone (GnRH) release in the hypothalamic–pituitary–gonadal (HPG) axis. Sex steroids released from the gonads act on KNDy neurons as inhibitors of kisspeptin release. This inhibition provides negative feedback control on the HPG axis.

KNDy peptide colocalization was first discovered in 2007 in sheep and was later confirmed to be present in mice, rats, cows and nonhuman primates. KNDy neurons are thought to be located in the hypothalamus region of human brains due to conservation across most mammalian species.

Other roles of KNDy neurons include influences on prolactin production; puberty; stress' effects on reproduction; and the control of thermoregulation.

== GnRH pulse regulation ==
KNDy neurons control GnRH pulse generation through the release of three known peptides: neurokinin B (NKB), dynorphin and kisspeptin. NKB and dynorphin are the two peptides that regulate the secretion of kisspeptin. NKB is the stimulating peptide that initiates the pulsatile release of GnRH by activating NKB receptors, called TACR3, on mutually connected KNDy neurons to release kisspeptin in an autocrine signalling pathway. Kisspeptin then activates the GPR54 receptors on GnRH neurons inducing the pulsatile release of GnRH and on KNDy neurons, adding to the stimulatory effect of NKB. Eventually the pulse is terminated by dynorphin, which acts on κ-opioid receptors (KOR) in KNDy neurons to inhibit NKB and kisspeptin secretion and inhibits GnRH secretion acting directly on GnRH neuron receptors.

== Sexual dimorphism in KNDy neuron populations ==
KNDy neurons are most densely located in the arcuate nucleus (ARC) of the hypothalamus, but also exist in the rostral periventricular area of third ventricle (RP3V) and the preoptic area (POA). Expression of the KNDy peptides highlighted has been shown to differentiate between species, sexes, and with fluctuating steroidal hormonal levels. Improvements in immunohistochemistry and deep-brain imaging techniques have revealed information about KNDy cell populations and sexual dimorphism. Larger populations appear in the female ARC than in the male ARC. The RP3V is composed of the anteroventral periventricular nucleus (APVN) and the preoptic periventricular nucleus, where KNDy neurons are sexually dimorphic. KNDy populations and sexual dimorphism appear in most species studied, including humans, but presence in the RP3V is primarily associated with rodents, with similar sexual dimorphism.

== Steroid hormone feedback ==
Negative feedback of steroid hormones in both males and females controls the pulsatile nature of GnRH secretion, subsequently increasing or decreasing the release of LH and FSH from the anterior pituitary. This is mediated by estrogen receptor α (ERα), expressed on KNDy neurons. The binding of estrogen or testosterone to this receptor in the ARC region inhibits KNDy neurons and therefore prevents GnRH release. KNDy neurons are involved in positive feedback of the HPG axis. This mechanism is best exemplified by the LH surge in the female reproductive cycle, where the increase of estrogen from the growing ovarian follicle causes positive feedback in the AVPV region, and subsequently a rise in LH from the pituitary.
