= Fezolinetant =

Chemical compound

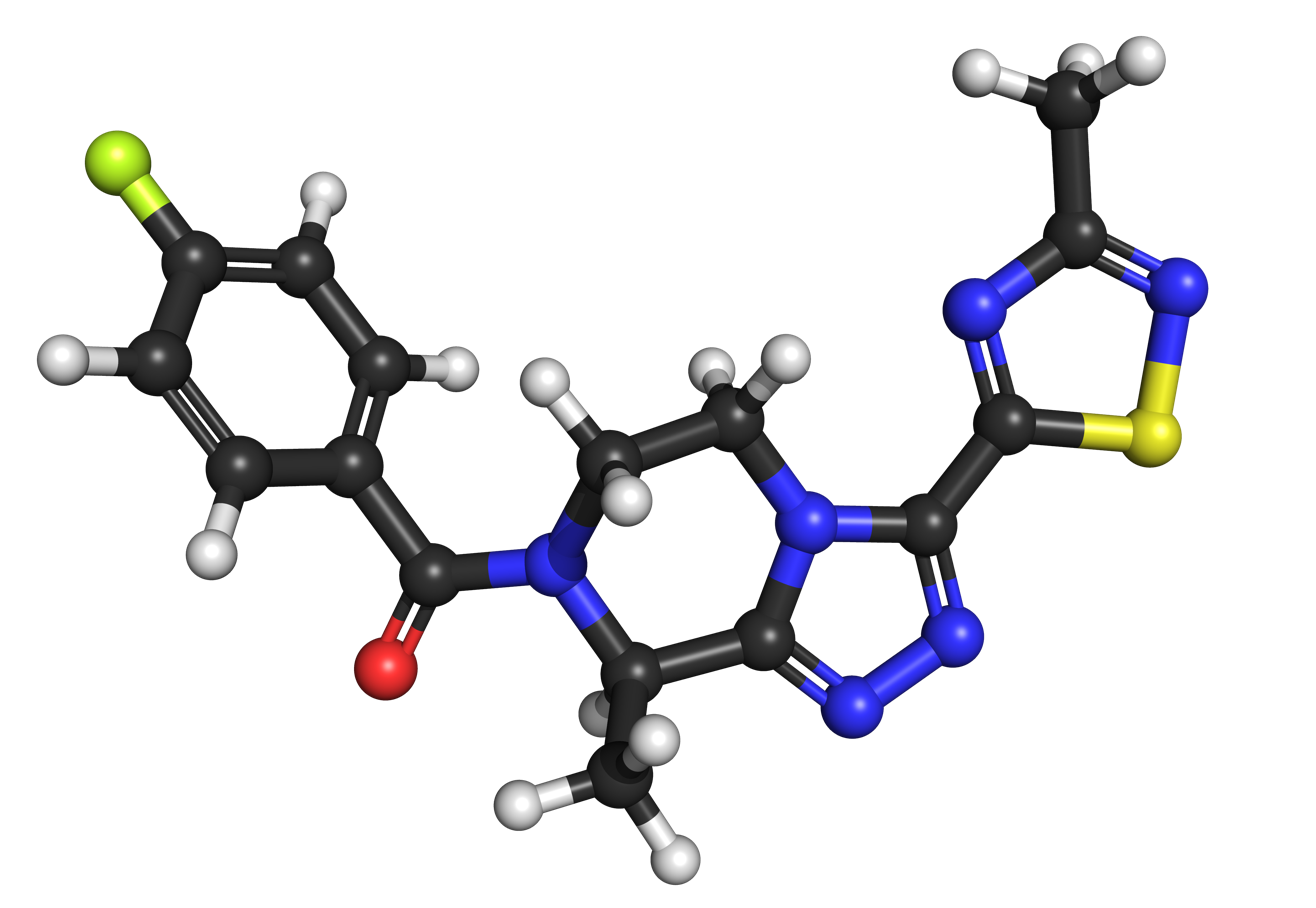
- Above: molecular structure of fezolinetant Below: 3D representation of a fezolinetant molecule

Clinical data
- Pronunciation: /ˌfɛzoʊˈlɪnətænt/ FEZ-oh-LIN-ə-tant
- Trade names: Veozah, Veoza
- Other names: ESN-364
- AHFS/Drugs.com: Monograph
- MedlinePlus: a623051
- License data: US DailyMed: Fezolinetant
- Pregnancy category: AU: B3
- Routes of administration: By mouth
- ATC code: G02CX06 (WHO)

Legal status
- Legal status: AU: S4 (Prescription only); CA: ℞-only; US: ℞-only; EU: Rx-only

Pharmacokinetic data
- Protein binding: 51%
- Metabolism: CYP1A2, (CYP2C9, CYP2C19 to lesser extent)
- Metabolites: ES259564
- Elimination half-life: 9.6h
- Excretion: Urine 76.9%, feces 14.7%

Identifiers
- IUPAC name: (4-fluorophenyl)-[(8R)-8-methyl-3-(3-methyl-1,2,4-thiadiazol-5-yl)-6,8-dihydro-5H-[1,2,4]triazolo[4,3-a]pyrazin-7-yl]methanone
- CAS Number: 1629229-37-3
- PubChem CID: 117604931
- DrugBank: DB15669
- ChemSpider: 58828046
- UNII: 83VNE45KXX
- KEGG: D11976
- ChEBI: CHEBI:229236
- ChEMBL: ChEMBL3608680
- CompTox Dashboard (EPA): DTXSID601103615

Chemical and physical data
- Formula: C_{16}H_{15}FN_{6}OS
- Molar mass: 358.40 g·mol^{−1}
- 3D model (JSmol): Interactive image
- SMILES: C[C@@H]1C2=NN=C(N2CCN1C(=O)C3=CC=C(C=C3)F)C4=NC(=NS4)C
- InChI: InChI=1S/C16H15FN6OS/c1-9-13-19-20-14(15-18-10(2)21-25-15)23(13)8-7-22(9)16(24)11-3-5-12(17)6-4-11/h3-6,9H,7-8H2,1-2H3/t9-/m1/s1; Key:PPSNFPASKFYPMN-SECBINFHSA-N

Fezolinetant, sold under the brand name Veozah, among others, is a medication used for the treatment of hot flashes (vasomotor symptoms) due to menopause. It is a small-molecule, selective neurokinin-3 (NK_{3}) receptor antagonist taken by mouth. It was developed by Astellas Pharma, which acquired it from Ogeda (formerly Euroscreen) in April 2017.

The most common side effects of fezolinetant include abdominal pain, diarrhea, insomnia, back pain, hot flush, and elevated hepatic transaminases.

Fezolinetant was approved for medical use in the United States in May 2023, and it was approved in the European Union in December 2023. Fezolinetant is the first NK_{3} receptor antagonist approved by the US Food and Drug Administration (FDA) to treat moderate to severe hot flashes from menopause. The FDA considers it to be a first-in-class medication.

== Medical uses ==
Fezolinetant is indicated for the treatment of moderate to severe vasomotor symptoms due to menopause.

== Adverse effects ==
In September 2024, the US FDA added a warning to the prescribing label that fezolinetant can cause rare but serious liver injury.

== History ==
In May 2017, fezolinetant had completed phase I and phase IIa clinical trials for hot flashes in postmenopausal females. Phase IIa trials in polyendocrine metabolic ovarian syndrome (PMOS) patients are ongoing.

In March 2023, results from SKYLIGHT 1, a Phase III clinical study of the treatment of moderate to severe hot flashes due to menopause, were published in The Lancet.

Fezolinetant shows high affinity for and potent inhibition of the NK_{3} receptor in vitro (K_{i} = 25 nM, IC_{50} = 20 nM). Loss-of-function mutations in TACR and TACR3, the genes respectively encoding neurokinin B and its receptor, the NK_{3} receptor, have been found in patients with idiopathic hypogonadotropic hypogonadism. In accordance, NK_{3} receptor antagonists like fezolinetant have been found to dose-dependently suppress luteinizing hormone (LH) secretion, though not that of follicle-stimulating hormone (FSH), and consequently to dose-dependently decrease estradiol and progesterone levels in females and testosterone levels in males. As such, they are similar to GnRH modulators, and present as a potential clinical alternative to them for use in the same kinds of indications. However, the inhibition of sex hormone production by NK_{3} receptor inactivation tends to be less complete and "non-castrating" relative to that of GnRH modulators, and so they may have a reduced incidence of menopausal-like side effects such as loss of bone mineral density.

Unlike GnRH modulators, but similarly to estrogens, NK_{3} receptor antagonists including fezolinetant and MLE-4901 (also known as AZD-4901, formerly AZD-2624) have been found to alleviate hot flashes in menopausal females. This would seem to be independent of their actions on the hypothalamic–pituitary–gonadal axis and hence on sex hormone production. NK_{3} receptor antagonists are anticipated as a useful clinical alternative to estrogens for management of hot flashes, but with potentially reduced risks and side effects.

The effectiveness of Veozah to treat moderate to severe hot flashes was demonstrated in each of the first 12-week, randomized, placebo-controlled, double-blind portions of two phase III clinical trials. In both trials, after the first 12 weeks, the females on placebo were then re-randomized to Veozah for a 40-week extension study to evaluate safety. Each trial ran a total of 52 weeks. The average age of the trial participants was 54 years old.

The FDA granted the application for fezolinetant priority review designation. The approval of Veozah was granted to Astellas Pharma US, Inc.

== Society and culture ==
=== Legal status ===
In October 2023, the Committee for Medicinal Products for Human Use of the European Medicines Agency adopted a positive opinion, recommending the granting of a marketing authorization for the medicinal product Veoza, intended for the treatment of hot flushes (vasomotor symptoms) associated with menopause. The applicant for this medicinal product is Astellas Pharma Europe B.V.

Fezolinetant was approved for medical use in the United States in May 2023, and in the European Union in December 2023.

=== Brand names ===
Fezolinetant is the international nonproprietary name.

Fezolinetant is sold under the brand names Veozah and Veoza.
