= Elinzanetant =

Chemical compound

Clinical data
- Pronunciation: /ˌɛlɪnˈzænətænt/ EL-in-ZA-nə-tant
- Trade names: Lynkuet
- Other names: BAY-3427080; GSK-1144814; GSK-1144814A; NT-814
- AHFS/Drugs.com: Monograph
- MedlinePlus: a625113
- License data: US DailyMed: Elinzanetant
- Routes of administration: Oral
- Drug class: Neurokinin NK_{1} and NK_{3} receptor antagonist
- ATC code: G02CX07 (WHO)

Legal status
- Legal status: CA: ℞-only; UK: POM (Prescription only); US: ℞-only; EU: Rx-only

Identifiers
- IUPAC name: N-[6-[(7S,9aS)-7-(hydroxymethyl)-3,4,6,7,9,9a-hexahydro-1H-pyrazino[2,1-c][1,4]oxazin-8-yl]-4-(4-fluoro-2-methylphenyl)pyridin-3-yl]-2-[3,5-bis(trifluoromethyl)phenyl]-N,2-dimethylpropanamide
- CAS Number: 929046-33-3
- PubChem CID: 16063568
- ChemSpider: 17223178
- UNII: NZW2BOW35N
- KEGG: D12123
- CompTox Dashboard (EPA): DTXSID101337049

Chemical and physical data
- Formula: C_{33}H_{35}F_{7}N_{4}O_{3}
- Molar mass: 668.657 g·mol^{−1}
- 3D model (JSmol): Interactive image
- SMILES: CC1=C(C=CC(=C1)F)C2=CC(=NC=C2N(C)C(=O)C(C)(C)C3=CC(=CC(=C3)C(F)(F)F)C(F)(F)F)N4C[C@H]5COCCN5C[C@H]4CO
- InChI: InChI=1S/C33H35F7N4O3/c1-19-9-23(34)5-6-26(19)27-13-29(44-16-25-18-47-8-7-43(25)15-24(44)17-45)41-14-28(27)42(4)30(46)31(2,3)20-10-21(32(35,36)37)12-22(11-20)33(38,39)40/h5-6,9-14,24-25,45H,7-8,15-18H2,1-4H3/t24-,25-/m0/s1; Key:DWRIJNIPBUFCQS-DQEYMECFSA-N

Elinzanetant, sold under the brand name Lynkuet, is a medication used for the treatment of moderate to severe vasomotor symptoms (hot flashes) due to menopause. It is taken orally.

The drug acts as a selective neurokinin NK_{1} and NK_{3} receptor antagonist.

Elinzanetant was approved for medical use in the United States in October 2025. The US Food and Drug Administration considers it to be a first-in-class medication.

== Medical uses ==
Elinzanetant is indicated for the treatment of moderate to severe vasomotor symptoms associated with menopause.

== Pharmacology ==
=== Pharmacodynamics ===
Elinzanetant has been found to dose-dependently suppress luteinizing hormone, estradiol, and progesterone levels in premenopausal women.

== History ==
Elinzanetant was developed by Bayer Healthcare.

The US Food and Drug Administration approved elinzanetant based on evidence from three clinical studies (OASIS-1 [NCT05042362], OASIS-2 [NCT05099159], and OASIS-3 [NCT05030584]) involving 1,423 participants. Of these participants, 1,420 received treatment with either elinzanetant 120 mg or placebo during the studies.

These trials were conducted at 267 clinical sites in 21 countries, with OASIS-1 taking place in 89 centers in nine countries (Austria, Czech Republic, Greece, Hungary, Israel, Italy, Netherlands, and the United States), OASIS-2 in 95 centers in 10 countries (Canada, Czech Republic, Germany, Italy, Norway, Poland, Portugal, Slovakia, Switzerland, and the United States), and OASIS-3 in 83 centers in nine countries (Belgium, Bulgaria, Canada, Denmark, Finland, Poland, Spain, the United Kingdom, and the United States).

OASIS-1 and OASIS-2 were used to assess the efficacy of elinzanetant. OASIS-1, OASIS-2, and OASIS 3 were used to assess the safety of elinzanetant. Only OASIS-3 was placebo-controlled for the duration of 52 weeks.

== Society and culture ==
=== Legal status ===
Elinzanetant was approved for medical use in the United States in October 2025.

In September 2025, the Committee for Medicinal Products for Human Use of the European Medicines Agency adopted a positive opinion, recommending the granting of a marketing authorization for the medicinal product Lynkuet, intended for the treatment of moderate to severe vasomotor symptoms (hot flushes). The applicant for this medicinal product is Bayer AG. Elinzanetant was authorized for medical use in the European Union in November 2025.

=== Names ===
Elinzanetant is the international nonproprietary name.

Elinzanetant is sold under the brand name Lynkuet.

== Research ==
In addition to approval for vasomotor symptoms, elinzanetant is under development for the treatment of sleep disorders. It is in phase 2 clinical trials for this indication. The drug was also under development for the treatment of schizophrenia and opioid-related disorders, but development was discontinued for these uses.
