= Timing hypothesis (menopausal hormone therapy) =

Scientific theory

The timing hypothesis, gap hypothesis, gap theory, or critical window hypothesis for menopausal hormone therapy is a scientific theory that the benefits and risks of menopausal hormone therapy (MHT—formerly referred to as hormone replacement therapy (HRT)) vary depending on the amount of time a woman has been in menopause upon initiation of treatment. More specifically, it is thought that hormone therapy may be protective against coronary heart disease in women who initiate it in early menopause but may be harmful in women who start it in late menopause.

Some have proposed that the increase in breast cancer risk may be greater in women who start hormone therapy early in menopause, but that risk may be lower or even decreased in women who start in late menopause. However, the Women's Health Initiative found that the risk of invasive breast cancer was similar irrespective of timing, with risks increasing by duration of exposure rather than timing of initiation; The absolute increase in risk in the WHI was very small in the estrogen-plus-progestin group (an excess of 8 cases per 10,000 person-years) and was reduced in the estrogen-only group.

A similar timing effect may apply to the risk of dementia with hormone therapy.

The influence of hormone therapy on depressive symptoms may additionally be influenced by menopausal stage, with significant benefit seen in perimenopausal women but not in postmenopausal women. The timing hypothesis is potentially able to resolve conflicting findings between large observational studies and randomized controlled trials on long-term health outcomes with menopausal hormone therapy.
