= Synthetic cannabinoid use disorder =

Medical condition associated with drug use

Synthetic Cannabinoid Use Disorder (SCUD)
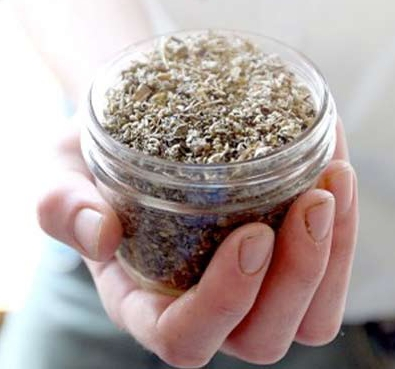
- Synthetic Cannabinoids (otherwise known as 'Spice')
- Symptoms: Hallucinations, anxiety, respiratory depression, kidney failure, psychosis and more
- Pathogenesis: Hyperactivation of CB1 receptors, cross-reactivity with non-cannabinoid receptors and toxic metabolites
- Differences: Receptor activation and potency, metabolic and pharmacokinetic differences, neurobiological adaptations
- Diagnosis: DSM-5, clinical interviews and toxicology reports
- Treatment: Benzodiazepines, neuroleptics and cognitive behavioural therapy
- Epidemiology: Prevalence, behavioural drivers, harm reduction and government response

Synthetic Cannabinoid Use Disorder (SCUD) is a psychiatric condition characterised by the rise of significant health problems from the continued use of synthetic cannabinoids (otherwise known as 'Spice' or 'K2').

Synthetic cannabinoids are artificially modified chemicals that imitate the effects of delta-9-tetrahydrocannabinol, the main psychoactive compound in cannabis. Symptoms of SCUD include hallucinations, anxiety, kidney failure and a range of other health problems. While synthetic cannabinoids bind to the cannabinoid receptors in the body like natural cannabis, they are more aggressive and have greater potency, causing unpredictable side effects. These effects are attributed to the hyperactivation of CB1 receptors, toxic metabolites, and more.

While there is no set diagnostic criteria for SCUD, it can be diagnosed similarly to substance-use disorders according to guidelines set by the DSM-5. When SCUD is identified, pharmacotherapies and psychotherapeutic strategies are recommended to treat symptoms.

The popularity of synthetic cannabinoids is attributed to their powerful psychoactive effects and legal status in a large number of countries around the world. Due to this, the prevalence rate of synthetic cannabinoid use has gone from 0.17% in 2021 to 0.26% in 2023 in just the United States, with SCUD cases rising each year.

== Signs and symptoms ==
SCUD is characterised by a myriad of physiological, psychological and behavioural dysfunctions as a consequence of chronic use of synthetic cannabinoids. It has all the signs and symptoms of regular cannabinoid use disorder, only SCUD symptoms are more extreme and often unpredictable; at times even life-threatening.

Intoxication

Spread of pain from myocardial infarction - an extreme symptom of SCUD

Use of synthetic cannabinoids prompts intoxication, which subsequently develops into impaired cognition, judgement and motor control, euphoria, a slowed sense of time and in rare occasions, myocardial infarction.

However, to be sure that these symptoms are caused by synthetic cannabinoid use and not any other underlying health issues, two hours later individuals should also exhibit at least two of the following: dry mouth, increased appetite, tachycardia and conjunctival injection.

After constant use, users will find they require higher doses of synthetic cannabinoids to achieve the same effect due to the high binding affinity of synthetic cannabis to the body's cannabinoid receptors. Long-term large dose usage of synthetic cannabinoids can result in coma, overdose or death.

Withdrawal

Withdrawal from using can cause physiological and psychological pain. Common physical symptoms are insomnia, excessive sweating, headaches and nausea, while cravings, irritability, depression and aggression are typical psychological ones. When serious, users may also experience fever, tremors and seizures.

=== Complications ===
Synthetic Cannabis Induced Disorders

There are multiple synthetic cannabis induced disorders, with a few examples being psychotic, anxiety and sleep disorders.

- Cannabis-Induced Psychotic Disorder: Psychosis, hallucinations, paranoia, delusions and if drastic, cognitive impairment.
- Anxiety Disorder: Panic attacks and anxiety.
- Sleep Disorder: Severe disturbance in sleep, causing distress and impairment in social settings such as work or school.

Other Complications

Aside from the psychological and physiological problems displayed in intoxication, withdrawal and induced disorders, long-term synthetic cannabis use may also trigger the following health issues:

- Respiratory depression
- Gastrointestinal problems such as nausea, vomiting and appetite loss
- Cardiovascular problems such as myocardial infarction, hypertension and stroke
- Kidney failure and muscle damage

== Pathogenesis ==
Endocannabinoid signalling pathway and synaptic transmission from hyperactivation of CB1 receptors

Synthetic cannabinoid use disorder is characterised by the hyper-activation of CB1 receptors, as synthetic cannabinoids act as agonists with a stronger binding affinity than natural cannabis. Cannabinoid receptors are extensively distributed everywhere in the body, but especially in brain regions responsible for functions such as memory, movement and emotion. Activation of these receptors changes the way signals are sent between nerve cells in the brain and other parts of the body, influencing both excitatory and inhibitory synaptic transmission by reducing neurotransmitter release in the synaptic cleft.

Additionally, synthetic cannabinoids interfere with neurogenesis-related processes and brain-derived neurotrophic factor expression, disrupting endocannabinoid homeostasis. This dysregulation then manifests as physiological symptoms of SCUD, where the location of CB1 receptor activation correlates with specific health complications. An example would be the activation of CB1 receptors in bronchial smooth muscles, which consequently triggers airway constriction, interfering with gas exchange and inducing respiratory depression.

Synthetic cannabinoids exhibit cross-reactivity with non-cannabinoid receptors due to structural similarities. Hyper-activation of CB1 receptors on GABAergic interneurons in the ventral tegmental area reduces GABA release onto dopaminergic neurons. While not only reinforcing drug-seeking behaviour through increasing tonic dopamine release in the nucleus accumbens, GABAergic inhibition also plays a significant role in maintaining and lowering an individual's seizure threshold.

Furthermore, synthetic cannabinoids mimic serotonin at 5-HT receptors, triggering serotonin syndrome. Serotonin syndrome can lead to anxiety, psychosis and perceptual distortions through amplified glutamatergic activity in the prefrontal cortex.

Certain metabolites of synthetic cannabinoids are known to exhibit toxic effects by influencing cannabinoid receptor activity. Some metabolites derived from synthetic cannabinoids such as JWH-018 retain or increase CB1 receptor affinity, extending the psychotropic and physiological effects of the drug.

Neuroadaptations and Cognitive Decline

Chronic synthetic cannabinoid use disrupts synaptic plasticity, contributing to neuroadaptations and cognitive decline, altering how the brain works. Synthetic cannabinoids interfere with the normal functioning of the endocannabinoid system, leading to changes in the hippocampal and corticostriatal circuits, which plays a central role in performing appropriate goal-directed behaviour. These disruptions undermine neural connectivity and the brain's ability to adapt, which can impair memory, decision-making and other cognitive processes.

Toxicological Effects

Synthetic cannabinoids undergo rapid and extensive metabolism, primarily through phase-I reactions. These metabolites can contribute to the toxic effects of synthetic cannabinoids by altering their pharmacological activity. When smoked, synthetic cannabinoids undergo pyrolysis, producing thermal degradants with varying pharmacological activities. Some of these by-products retain high affinity for CB1 receptors and may surpass the parent compounds in efficacy, further stimulating CB1 receptor-mediated responses.

Synthetic cannabinoids can also interfere with the metabolism of other drugs, leading to potential drug-drug interactions. This interference could potentially alter the pharmacokinetics of co-administered substances, posing great health risks.

== Pathological differences between SCUD and Normal Cannabis Use Disorder ==
Aspect	SCUD	CUD
Receptor Activation and Potency	Synthetic cannabinoids act as full agonists at CB1 receptors, leading to more intense and prolonged activation, increasing the risk of adverse effects and rapid dependence.	Tetrahydrocannabinol (THC) acts as a partial agonist at CB1 receptors, producing milder effects and leading to a slower onset of dependence.
Metabolic and Pharmacokinetic Differences	Synthetic cannabinoids are metabolised into a variety of compounds, some retaining high affinity for CB1 receptors and producing toxic metabolites.	THC is metabolized into fewer psychoactive metabolites with less potential for toxic by-products.
Neurobiological Adaptations	Rapid CB1 receptor downregulation leads to severe withdrawal symptoms, intense cravings and accelerated neuroadaptations in reward circuits, increasing the risk of compulsive use.	Receptor down regulation occurs more gradually, resulting in less severe withdrawal symptoms and slower development of dependence.

== Diagnosis ==
While there is no set diagnostic criteria for SCUD, one way to identify it is through confirming an individual has a substance-use disorder through the DSM-5 - with the substance in question being synthetic cannabis. According to the DSM-5, the four basic categories determining substance-use disorder are:

1. Impaired control
2. Physical dependence
3. Social problems
4. Risky use
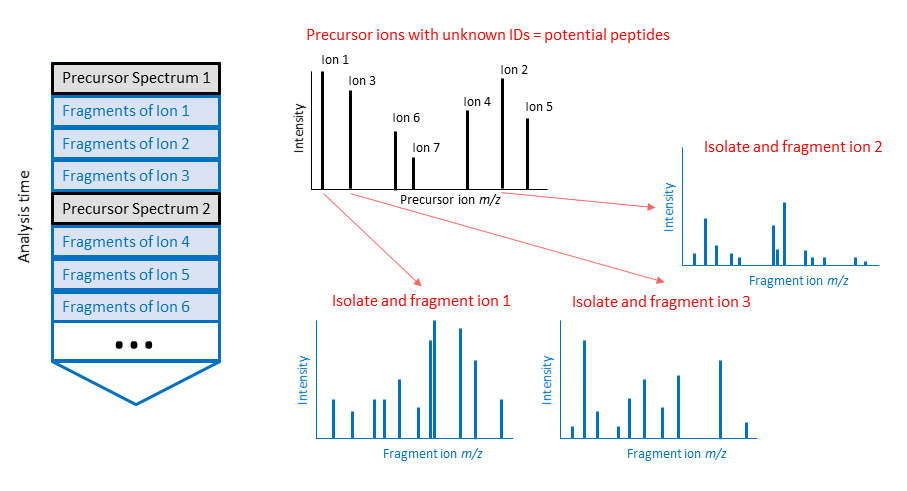
  Potential fragmentation patterns that come from LC-MS-MS detection

Users who have a substance-use disorder must possess more than two of the eleven symptoms on the DSM-5 substance-use disorder criteria within twelve months while exhibiting the above categories. To evaluate whether an individual fits the framework, usually a clinical interview is performed to assess use patterns and other psychiatric symptoms.

Another way to diagnose SCUD is through urine toxicology, though standard tests often fail due to being negative for synthetic cannabimimetics. Many studies have turned to using LC-MS-MS detection as the test has the chemical variability to analyse the fragmentation patterns of synthetic cannabinoids.

Lastly, before a diagnosis of SCUD, it is important to rule out natural cannabis use, other substance toxicity and psychiatric disorders.

== Treatment ==
Treatment for SCUD revolves around symptom relief and behavioural therapies, as currently no FDA-approved medications exist.

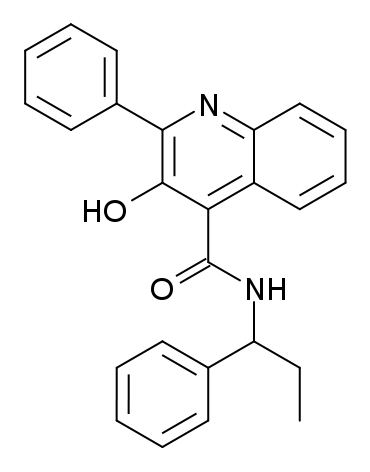
Talnetant - an example of a neuroleptic used to treat psychosis

Withdrawal support consists of a gradual decrease in drug dosage to reduce discomfort and prevent relapse. Pharmacotherapies such as benzodiazepines and antipsychotics can be included in treatment to address panic attacks and psychosis, respectively. These medications work in a similar manner - by blocking neurotransmitters such as dopamine, acetylcholine and norepinephrine from attaching to certain receptors.

Psychotherapeutic strategies that have been tested are behavioural therapies like cognitive behavioural therapy, which help address user cravings and triggers. Additionally, a calm and supportive non-stimulating environment has also been seen to benefit patients.

Monitoring patient adherence and their psychological symptoms may help predict and prevent potential relapses, as one of the main challenges of treating SCUD are the high relapse rates due to potent cravings.

Harm Reduction Strategies

Though synthetic cannabinoids should be avoided as much as possible, there are strategies that can be implemented to reduce harm when using:

- Take the drug in small doses
- Avoid using it when on other drugs or while drunk
- Take breaks from the drug to avoid building up a tolerance and becoming dependent
- Use in the presence of trusted people
- If experiencing negative symptoms, call for help from emergency services immediately

== Epidemiology ==
Prevalence

The prevalence rates of SCUD around the world are not completely known, with most research having been conducted in the United States. However, from current trends the use of synthetic cannabinoids and prevalence of SCUD has been steadily increasing, with prevalence rates rising from 0.17% in 2021 to 0.26% in 2023 in the United States alone.

The largest demographic of individuals using synthetic cannabinoids who have had to visit emergency rooms are youth aged 12–29, with 4.5% - 13.5% of high school students reporting life-time use in New York.

Liberia and Sierra Leone have declared a public health emergency in response to the widespread use of a synthetic drug mixture known as Kush, which often contains synthetic cannabinoids.

Behavioural drivers

Certain groups are more vulnerable to synthetic cannabinoid use than others:

- Male individuals (odds ratio = 2.63)
- Aged 16 to 17 years (odds ratio = 1.99)
- Residents of urban areas (odds ratio = 1.57)

Research has also shown mental health conditions such as anxiety and depression can lead to behaviours that significantly contribute to synthetic cannabinoid use. For example, individuals may attempt to use synthetic cannabinoids to self-medicate in order to manage the symptoms of the mentioned disorders, which could lead to misuse and dependency.

== Society and culture ==
Governments around the world have recognised the consequences if synthetic cannabinoids become widespread. Specific examples of fighting against this drug include the UK and Barbados. In response to the threat posed by synthetic cannabis, the UK implemented The Psychoactive Substances Act 2016, which bans the production, distribution, sale and supply of psychoactive substances intended for human consumption. On the other hand, the government of Barbados has established an early warning drug alert system to address synthetic cannabinoids.

The United Nations Office on Drugs and Crime has also launched the Global SMART program in which a multitude of countries such as Australia, Canada, Japan, Russia and the United States have joined. This program aims to reduce the supply and demand of synthetic drugs like synthetic cannabinoids, as well as enact laws to ban the substance. These countries are also working together to share intelligence on what have been the most effective practices in limiting synthetic cannabinoid use.
