= Gonadotropin-releasing hormone =

Mammalian protein found in Homo sapiens

GNRH1
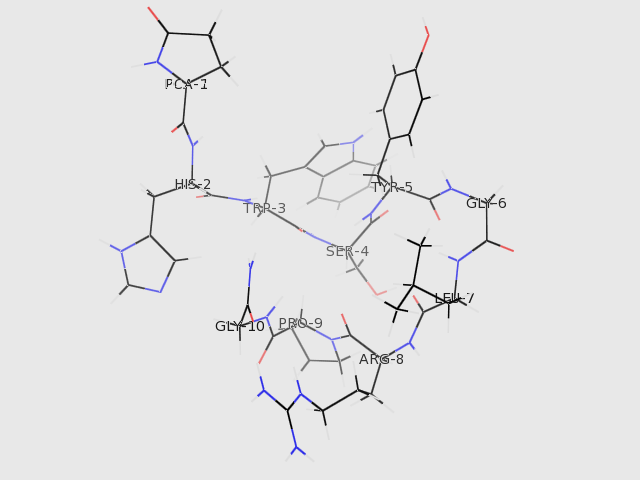

Identifiers
- Aliases: GNRH1, GNRH, GRH, HH12, LHRH, LNRH, gonadotropin releasing hormone 1, Gonadotropin-Releasing Hormone
- External IDs: OMIM: 152760; MGI: 95789; GeneCards: GNRH1

Gene location (Human)
Chr.	Chromosome 8 (human)
Band	8p21.2	Start	25,419,258 bp
Band	8p21.2	End	25,424,654 bp

Gene location (Mouse)
Chr.	Chromosome 14 (mouse)
Band	14|14 D1	Start	67,982,630 bp
Band	14|14 D1	End	67,986,888 bp
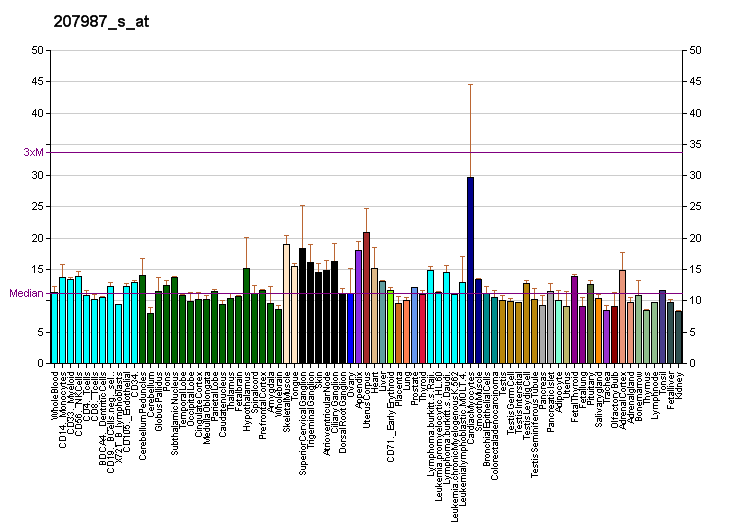
RNA expression pattern
Bgee	Human / Mouse (ortholog); Top expressed in: tibial nerve; testicle; cerebellar hemisphere; putamen; ascending aorta; Descending thoracic aorta; mucosa of transverse colon; right hemisphere of cerebellum; popliteal artery; tibial arteries / Top expressed in: primary oocyte; bone marrow; embryonic cell; zygote; secondary oocyte; morula; neural layer of retina; granulocyte; thymus; preoptic area; More reference expression data
BioGPS	More reference expression data
Gene ontology
Molecular function	hormone activity; gonadotropin hormone-releasing hormone activity; gonadotropin-releasing hormone receptor binding
Cellular component	axon terminus; perikaryon; Golgi-associated vesicle; extracellular region; neurosecretory vesicle; dendrite; mitochondrion; neuron projection; cytoplasmic side of rough endoplasmic reticulum membrane; extracellular space
Biological process	negative regulation of immature T cell proliferation; response to prolactin; negative regulation of neuron migration; response to potassium ion; response to organic cyclic compound; response to testosterone; estrous cycle; female pregnancy; cell-cell signaling; response to steroid hormone; ageing; response to peptide hormone; negative regulation of apoptotic process; male sex determination; multicellular organism development; response to prostaglandin E; response to lipopolysaccharide; response to corticosteroid; regulation of gene expression; ovarian cycle; response to ethanol; regulation of ovarian follicle development; signal transduction; negative regulation of cell population proliferation; regulation of signaling receptor activity; G protein-coupled receptor signaling pathway; reproduction
Sources:Amigo / QuickGO
Orthologs
Databases	NCBI: entry; OMA: entry
Species	Human	Mouse
Entrez	2796	14714
Ensembl	ENSG00000147437	ENSMUSG00000015812
UniProt	P01148	P13562
RefSeq (mRNA)	NM_001083111; NM_000825	NM_008145
RefSeq (protein)	NP_000816; NP_001076580	NP_032171
Location (UCSC)	Chr 8: 25.42 – 25.42 Mb	Chr 14: 67.98 – 67.99 Mb
PubMed search
- Wikidata
View/Edit Human	View/Edit Mouse

Gonadotropin-releasing hormone (GnRH), also known as gonadoliberin or luteinizing hormone-releasing hormone (LHRH), is a peptide hormone released in pulses by neurons in the hypothalamus. It stimulates the anterior pituitary to secrete luteinizing hormone (LH) and follicle-stimulating hormone (FSH), which regulate reproductive function through the hypothalamic–pituitary–gonadal axis.

GnRH belongs to a family of related peptides. In humans, GnRH1 is the form that regulates pituitary gonadotropin secretion and is usually referred to simply as GnRH.

Gonadorelin is the international nonproprietary name (INN) for the pharmaceutical form of GnRH.

== Gene ==
In humans, the GNRH1 gene, which encodes the GnRH precursor, is located on chromosome 8 at 8p21.2.

== Structure ==
In humans, mature GnRH is a decapeptide produced by processing a 92-amino acid preprohormone. The mature peptide has an N-terminal pyroglutamic acid residue and an amidated C-terminal glycine.

The identity of GnRH was clarified by the 1977 Nobel Laureates Roger Guillemin and Andrew V. Schally:

pyroGlu-His-Trp-Ser-Tyr-Gly-Leu-Arg-Pro-Gly-NH_{2}

== Secretion and regulation ==
=== GnRH neurons and pulsatile release ===
During embryonic development, GnRH neurons originate in the nasal region and migrate into the brain. In humans, their cell bodies are found in the medial preoptic area and the infundibular nucleus of the hypothalamus.

In mice, the long dendrites of GnRH neurons can form bundles and receive shared synaptic input. This arrangement may help coordinate the activity of these neurons.

GnRH neurons release the hormone in pulses from their terminals at the median eminence. The hypophyseal portal system carries these pulses to the anterior pituitary, where they regulate the secretion of luteinizing hormone (LH) and follicle-stimulating hormone (FSH). GnRH is metabolized within minutes in the peripheral circulation, so researchers often use LH pulses as an indirect measure of GnRH secretion in humans.

=== Regulation of secretion ===
GnRH neurons receive input from neurons that use norepinephrine, GABA, and glutamate as neurotransmitters. Kisspeptin stimulates GnRH release. In the arcuate nucleus, KNDy neurons produce kisspeptin, neurokinin B, and dynorphin. Synchronized activity in this network leads to episodic kisspeptin release, which helps generate GnRH pulses.

In sheep, some kisspeptin-producing neurons in both the preoptic area and the arcuate nucleus express estrogen receptor alpha, providing a route by which estradiol can influence GnRH secretion.

Estradiol exerts negative feedback on pulsatile GnRH secretion during most of the ovarian cycle. In spontaneously ovulating mammals, sustained high estradiol levels exert positive feedback on the hypothalamic–pituitary–gonadal axis, triggering the preovulatory luteinizing hormone surge. A GnRH surge accompanies this response in several species, but whether a distinct GnRH surge occurs in humans remains uncertain.

Multiple neuronal regions in the limbic system send signals to the hypothalamus to modulate the amount of GnRH production and the frequency of pulses. This provides a possible explanation for why psychic influences typically affect female sexual function.

In the African cichlid Astatotilapia burtoni, males given an opportunity to rise in social rank showed increased expression of one form of GnRH and enlargement of GnRH neuron cell bodies. In convict cichlids, GnRH neuron cell bodies were larger in territorial males than in nonterritorial males and varied in size with breeding state in females.

=== Changes across the lifespan ===
In humans, the hypothalamic–pituitary–gonadal axis is active during fetal development and again during early infancy. This postnatal period of activity, known as minipuberty, occurs mainly during the first six months of life. During this period, gonadotropins and sex steroids contribute to the maturation of the reproductive organs. The axis then becomes relatively inactive during childhood and is reactivated at puberty.

== Function ==
=== Pituitary signaling ===
GnRH stimulates the synthesis and secretion of luteinizing hormone (LH) and follicle-stimulating hormone (FSH) by binding to the gonadotropin-releasing hormone receptor (GnRHR) on gonadotropes in the anterior pituitary. GnRHR is a seven-transmembrane G protein-coupled receptor. Its activation stimulates phosphoinositide phospholipase C, which increases intracellular calcium and activates protein kinase C. The frequency and amplitude of GnRH pulses help regulate pituitary LH and FSH output during the reproductive years.

=== Other organs ===
GnRH is found in organs outside of the hypothalamus and pituitary, and its role in other life processes is poorly understood. For instance, there is likely to be a role for GnRH1 in the placenta and in the gonads. GnRH and GnRH receptors are also found in cancers of the breast, ovary, prostate, and endometrium.

=== Reproductive behavior in animals ===
GnRH activity influences a variety of sexual behaviors. Increased levels of GnRH facilitate sexual displays and behavior in females. GnRH injections enhance copulation solicitation (a type of courtship display) in white-crowned sparrows. In mammals, GnRH injections facilitate sexual behavior of female display behaviors as shown with the musk shrew's (Suncus murinus) reduced latency in displaying rump presents and tail wagging towards males.

An elevation of GnRH raises males' testosterone capacity beyond a male's natural testosterone level. Injections of GnRH in male birds immediately after an aggressive territorial encounter results in higher testosterone levels than is observed naturally during an aggressive territorial encounter.

A compromised GnRH system has adverse effects on reproductive physiology and maternal behavior. In comparison to female mice with a normal GnRH system, female mice with a 30% decrease in GnRH neurons are poor caregivers to their offspring. These mice are more likely to leave their pups scattered rather than grouped together, and will take significantly longer to retrieve their pups.

== Clinical significance ==
Kallmann syndrome is a form of congenital GnRH deficiency associated with a reduced or absent sense of smell. Acquired conditions, including head trauma and tumors affecting the hypothalamus or pituitary, can impair gonadotropin secretion. Elevated prolactin levels can suppress pulsatile GnRH secretion.

== Medical uses ==
Gonadorelin hydrochloride (Factrel) was previously used in human medicine. GnRH analogues are used to modify gonadotropin secretion. GnRH agonists initially stimulate gonadotropin release, but sustained administration suppresses it. GnRH antagonists suppress gonadotropin release by blocking GnRH receptors in the pituitary.

Leuprorelin, a GnRH agonist available in long-acting depot formulations, is used to treat conditions including hormone-sensitive prostate cancer, breast cancer, endometriosis, and central precocious puberty. Florence Comite and colleagues reported early clinical studies of long-acting GnRH agonist treatment for precocious puberty in the 1980s.

A 2019 Cochrane review found that GnRH agonists given alongside chemotherapy probably reduced the risk of premature ovarian failure in premenopausal women. Evidence for improved ovulation and for recovery or maintenance of menstruation within 12 months was of low certainty, and the effect on pregnancy rates remained uncertain.

== Veterinary use ==
Gonadorelin diacetate tetrahydrate (Cystorelin) is used to treat ovarian follicular cysts in dairy cattle. Deslorelin, a synthetic GnRH analogue, is used as a sustained-release implant to control reproduction in animals.

== Research ==
GnRH receptor-targeted delivery of cytotoxic agents has been investigated as an experimental approach to treating cancers that express the receptor. In a similar concept, its use to deliver toxins to pituitary gonadotropes in animals has been explored as a means of sterilization, with limited success. GnRH was also shown to successfully deliver DNA into the pituitary gonadotropes where the expressed protein blocked expression of the hormones that regulate reproduction.

== See also ==
- Gonadotropin-releasing hormone receptor § Agonists
- GnRH modulator
- Progonadotropin
- Gonadotropin surge-attenuating factor
- GNRH2, a similar gene
- Gonadotropin-inhibitory hormone
- Breastfeeding and fertility
