= Pavinetant =

Chemical compound

Clinical data
- Other names: MLE-4901; AZD-4901; AZD-2624; AZ-12472520
- Routes of administration: By mouth

Identifiers
- IUPAC name: 3-(methanesulfonamido)-2-phenyl-N-[(1S)-1-phenylpropyl]quinoline-4-carboxamide
- CAS Number: 941690-55-7
- PubChem CID: 23649245
- ChemSpider: 28189763
- UNII: 3U471ZVC5K
- KEGG: D11345
- ChEBI: CHEBI:140478
- ChEMBL: ChEMBL3545233
- CompTox Dashboard (EPA): DTXSID10916204

Chemical and physical data
- Formula: C_{26}H_{25}N_{3}O_{3}S
- Molar mass: 459.56 g·mol^{−1}
- 3D model (JSmol): Interactive image
- SMILES: CC[C@@H](C1=CC=CC=C1)NC(=O)C2=C(C(=NC3=CC=CC=C32)C4=CC=CC=C4)NS(=O)(=O)C
- InChI: InChI=1S/C26H25N3O3S/c1-3-21(18-12-6-4-7-13-18)28-26(30)23-20-16-10-11-17-22(20)27-24(19-14-8-5-9-15-19)25(23)29-33(2,31)32/h4-17,21,29H,3H2,1-2H3,(H,28,30)/t21-/m0/s1; Key:QYTBBBAHNIWFOD-NRFANRHFSA-N

Pavinetant (INN, USAN; developmental code names MLE-4901, AZD-4901, AZ-12472520, AZD-2624), is a small-molecule, orally active, selective neurokinin-3 (NK_{3}) receptor antagonist which was under development by AstraZeneca and Millendo Therapeutics for the treatment of hot flashes and polyendocrine metabolic ovarian syndrome (PMOS). It was also under investigation for the treatment of schizophrenia, but development was discontinued for this indication due to lack of effectiveness. In November 2017, development of the medication for hot flashes and PMOS was also terminated after its developer assessed the clinical risks and benefits.

== See also ==
- Tachykinin receptor 3 § Agonists
- List of investigational antipsychotics
