= Osanetant =

Chemical compound

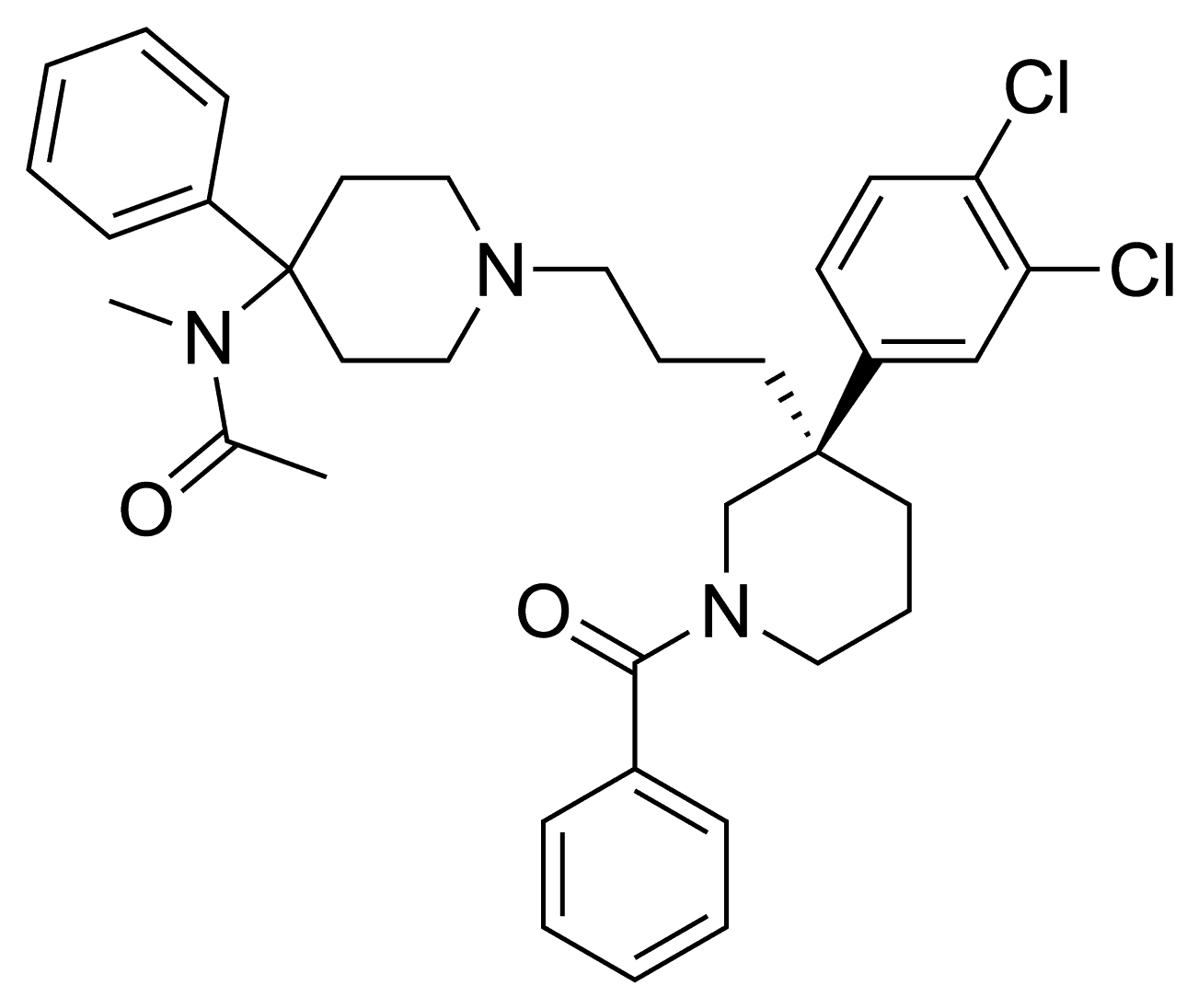

Clinical data
- ATC code: none

Identifiers
- IUPAC name: N-(1-{3-[(3R)-1-benzoyl-3-(3,4-dichlorophenyl)piperidin-3-yl]propyl}-4-phenylpiperidin-4-yl]-N-methylacetamide
- CAS Number: 160492-56-8
- PubChem CID: 219077
- IUPHAR/BPS: 2110
- ChemSpider: 189901
- UNII: K7G81N94DT
- ChEMBL: ChEMBL346178
- CompTox Dashboard (EPA): DTXSID901027521
- ECHA InfoCard: 100.233.307

Chemical and physical data
- Formula: C_{35}H_{41}Cl_{2}N_{3}O_{2}
- Molar mass: 606.63 g·mol^{−1}
- 3D model (JSmol): Interactive image
- SMILES: CC(=O)N(C)C1(CCN(CC1)CCC[C@@]2(CCCN(C2)C(=O)C3=CC=CC=C3)C4=CC(=C(C=C4)Cl)Cl)C5=CC=CC=C5
- InChI: InChI=1S/C35H41Cl2N3O2/c1-27(41)38(2)35(29-13-7-4-8-14-29)19-23-39(24-20-35)21-9-17-34(30-15-16-31(36)32(37)25-30)18-10-22-40(26-34)33(42)28-11-5-3-6-12-28/h3-8,11-16,25H,9-10,17-24,26H2,1-2H3/t34-/m0/s1; Key:DZOJBGLFWINFBF-UMSFTDKQSA-N

Osanetant (developmental code name SR-142,801) is a neurokinin 3 receptor antagonist which was developed by Sanofi-Synthélabo and was being researched for the treatment of schizophrenia but was discontinued. It was the first non-peptide NK_{3} antagonist developed in the mid-1990s.

Professor David J. Anderson, Director and Leadership Chair of the Tianqiao and Chrissy Chen Institute for Neuroscience at California Institute of Technology, has advocated that osanetant be explored as a treatment for pain, anxiety, and aggression in humans and companion animals experiencing bereavement or social isolation, citing research suggesting that osanetant has an excellent safety profile and suppresses negative effects of social isolation in mice through an evolutionarily-conserved mechanism and without acting as a depressant. Another potential application for osanetant is in the treatment of drug addiction, as it has been found to block the effects of cocaine in animal models.

Osanetant is being investigated by Acer Therapeutics as a treatment for severe vasomotor symptoms such as a hot flashes and flushes among women experiencing menopause.

== Synthesis ==
Several different syntheses have been reported. Below are representative examples.

Synthesis (Glaxo):

The reaction between 2-(3,4-Dichlorophenyl)-5-(tetrahydropyran-2-yloxy)pentanenitrile (1) and methyl acrylate (2) gives 4-Cyano-4-(3,4-dichlorophenyl)-7-(oxan-2-yloxy)heptanoic aci (3). Treatment with acid gives 3-[3-(3,4-Dichlorophenyl)-2,6-dioxopiperidin-3-yl]propyl acetate, CID:70104936 (4). Reduction of the imide with Borane dimethylsulfide afforded [182621-51-8] (5). The reaction of this intermediate with benzoyl chloride [98-88-4] gives CID:22741724 (6). Treatment with mesyl chloride completed the synthesis of CID:11812710 (7).

Synthesis (Warner Lambert):

The reaction of 1-Benzyl-4-phenyl-4-piperidinol [63843-83-4] (1) with trimethylsilyl cyanide and subsequent Ritter reaction gave N-(1-Benzyl-4-phenylpiperidin-4-yl)formamide, CID:10979305 (2). The reduction of the formamide with lithium aluminium hydride gave 1-benzyl-N-methyl-4-phenylpiperidin-4-amine [172734-03-1] (3). Reaction with acetic anhydride gave CID:22741820 (4). Catalytic hydrogenation removal of the benzyl protecting group gave N-Methyl-N-(4-phenylpiperidin-4-yl)acetamide [172733-87-8] (5).

Convergent synthesis completes the synthesis of Osanetant.

== CID:11119744 ==
Osanetant precursor:

Subsequent studies have shown that the Osanetant precursor is already a powerful BAT (biogenic amine transporter) substrate without the need for having to surmount the total synthesis of Osanetant. The Ki numbers in the patent for Ex 58 are NET = 2.4nM & DAT = 13.8nM.

This is not the first time that Sanofi produced a 3-arylpiperidine having BAT dopaminergic properties. For example, 3-[3-(Trifluoromethyl)phenyl]piperidine [64321-45-5] was reported in a previous patent. It was stated in the patent that such compounds can be expected to be able to treat depression, obesity, and Parkinson's disease.
