= Tachykinin receptor 3 =

Protein found in humans

TACR3

Identifiers
- Aliases: TACR3, HH11, NK-3R, NK3R, NKR, TAC3RL, Tachykinin receptor 3, TAC3R, NK3
- External IDs: OMIM: 162332; MGI: 892968; GeneCards: TACR3

Gene location (Human)
Chr.	Chromosome 4 (human)
Band	4q24	Start	103,586,031 bp
Band	4q24	End	103,719,985 bp

Gene location (Mouse)
Chr.	Chromosome 3 (mouse)
Band	3|3 G3	Start	134,534,768 bp
Band	3|3 G3	End	134,640,340 bp
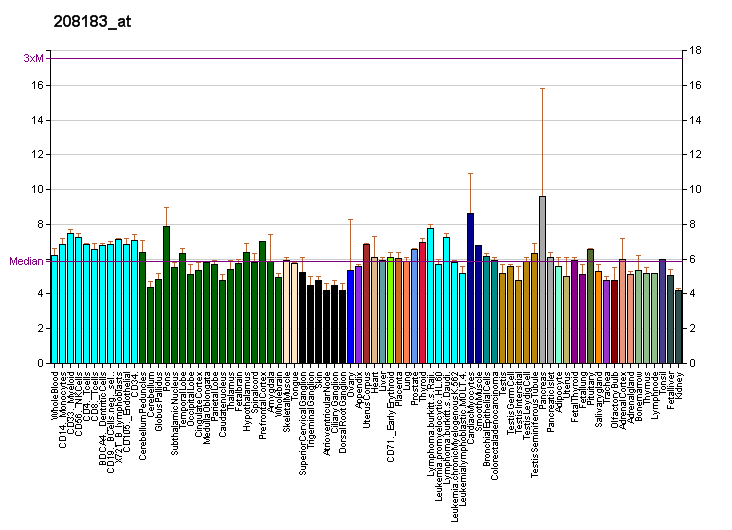
RNA expression pattern
Bgee	Human / Mouse (ortholog); Top expressed in: hypothalamus; C1 segment; prefrontal cortex; amygdala; urinary bladder; substantia nigra; ventricular zone; corpus callosum; Brodmann area 9; primary visual cortex / Top expressed in: iris; ventral tegmental area; substantia nigra; vestibular sensory epithelium; stria vascularis; lumbar subsegment of spinal cord; lateral hypothalamus; Gonadal ridge; cornea; adrenal cortex; More reference expression data
BioGPS	More reference expression data
Gene ontology
Molecular function	tachykinin receptor activity; G protein-coupled receptor activity; signal transducer activity; protein binding
Cellular component	cytoplasm; integral component of membrane; membrane; plasma membrane; integral component of plasma membrane; dendrite membrane; neuronal cell body membrane; nucleus; sperm midpiece
Biological process	response to estradiol; ageing; hyperosmotic salinity response; regulation of feeding behavior; regulation of dopamine metabolic process; positive regulation of heart rate; response to morphine; positive regulation of blood pressure; signal transduction; positive regulation of uterine smooth muscle contraction; response to cocaine; tachykinin receptor signaling pathway; positive regulation of flagellated sperm motility; G protein-coupled receptor signaling pathway
Sources:Amigo / QuickGO
Orthologs
Databases	NCBI: entry; OMA: entry
Species	Human	Mouse
Entrez	6870	21338
Ensembl	ENSG00000169836	ENSMUSG00000028172
UniProt	P29371	P47937
RefSeq (mRNA)	NM_001059	NM_021382
RefSeq (protein)	NP_001050	NP_067357
Location (UCSC)	Chr 4: 103.59 – 103.72 Mb	Chr 3: 134.53 – 134.64 Mb
PubMed search
- Wikidata
View/Edit Human	View/Edit Mouse

Tachykinin receptor 3, also known as TACR3, is a protein which in humans is encoded by the TACR3 gene.

== Function ==
This gene belongs to a family of genes that function as receptors for tachykinins. Receptor affinities are specified by variations in the 5'-end of the sequence. The receptors belonging to this family are characterized by interactions with G proteins and 7 hydrophobic transmembrane regions. This gene encodes the receptor for the tachykinin neurokinin 3, also referred to as neurokinin B.

== Selective ligands ==
A number of selective ligands are available for NK_{3}. NK_{3} receptor antagonists are being investigated as treatments for various indications.

=== Agonists ===
- Neurokinin B – endogenous peptide ligand, also interacts with other neurokinin receptors but has highest affinity for NK_{3}
- Senktide – 7-amino acid polypeptide, NK_{3} selective, CAS# 106128-89-6

=== Antagonists ===
- Elinzanetant (BAY-3427080 GSK-1144814, NT-814)
- Fezolinetant (ESN-364)
- Osanetant (SR-142,801)
- Pavinetant (MLE-4901, AZD-4901, AZD-2624)
- Talnetant (SB-223,412)
- SB-222,200 – potent and selective antagonist, K_{i} = 4.4 nM, 3-Methyl-2-phenyl-N-[(1S)-1-phenylpropyl]-4-quinolinecarboxamide, CAS# 174635-69-9
- SB-218,795 – more selective than SB-222,200, K_{i} = 13 nM, (R)-[(2-Phenyl-4-quinolinylcarbonyl)amino]-methyl ester benzeneacetic acid, CAS# 174635-53-1

== See also ==
- Tachykinin receptor
