= Tachykinin receptor =

InterPro Family

Identifiers
- Symbol: ?
- InterPro: IPR001681
Available protein structures:
- PDB: IPR001681
- AlphaFold: IPR001681

tachykinin receptor 1

Identifiers
- Symbol: TACR1
- Alt. symbols: TAC1R
- NCBI gene: 6869
- HGNC: 11526
- OMIM: 162323
- RefSeq: NM_001058
- UniProt: P25103

Other data
- Locus: Chr. 2 p13.1-p12
Search for
- Structures: Swiss-model
- Domains: InterPro

tachykinin receptor 2

Identifiers
- Symbol: TACR2
- Alt. symbols: TAC2R, NKNAR
- NCBI gene: 6865
- HGNC: 11527
- OMIM: 162321
- RefSeq: NM_001057
- UniProt: P21452

Other data
- Locus: Chr. 10 q11-q21
Search for
- Structures: Swiss-model
- Domains: InterPro

tachykinin receptor 3

Identifiers
- Symbol: TACR3
- NCBI gene: 6870
- HGNC: 11528
- OMIM: 162332
- RefSeq: NM_001059
- UniProt: P29371

Other data
- Locus: Chr. 4 q25
Search for
- Structures: Swiss-model
- Domains: InterPro

There are three known mammalian tachykinin receptors termed NK_{1}, NK_{2} and NK_{3}. All are members of the 7 transmembrane G-protein coupled receptor family and induce the activation of phospholipase C, producing inositol triphosphate (so called G_{q}-coupled).

Inhibitors of NK-1, known as NK-1 receptor antagonists, can be used as antiemetic agents, such as the drug aprepitant.

== Binding ==
The genes and receptor ligands are as follows:

Receptor	Gene	Preferred ligand
NK_{1}	TACR1	substance P
NK_{2}	TACR2	neurokinin A
NK_{3}	TACR3	neurokinin B

(Hökfelt et al., 2001; Page, 2004; Pennefather et al., 2004; Maggi, 2000)

== See also ==
- Substance P
- G protein coupled receptors
