= Talnetant =

Chemical compound

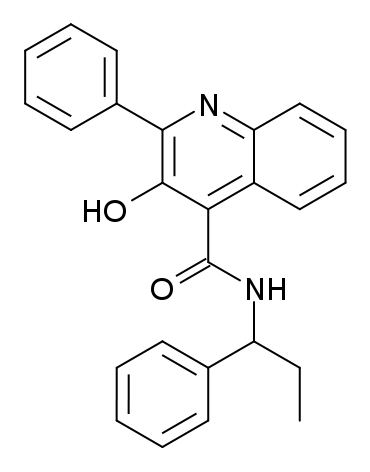

Clinical data
- ATC code: none

Identifiers
- IUPAC name: 3-hydroxy-2-phenyl-N-(1-phenylpropyl)quinoline-4-carboxamide
- CAS Number: 174636-32-9
- PubChem CID: 133090
- IUPHAR/BPS: 2124
- ChemSpider: 117450
- UNII: CZ3T9T146K
- ECHA InfoCard: 100.236.526

Chemical and physical data
- Formula: C_{25}H_{22}N_{2}O_{2}
- Molar mass: 382.463 g·mol^{−1}
- 3D model (JSmol): Interactive image
- SMILES: CCC(C1=CC=CC=C1)NC(=O)C2=C(C(=NC3=CC=CC=C32)C4=CC=CC=C4)O
- InChI: InChI=1S/C25H22N2O2/c1-2-20(17-11-5-3-6-12-17)27-25(29)22-19-15-9-10-16-21(19)26-23(24(22)28)18-13-7-4-8-14-18/h3-16,20,28H,2H2,1H3,(H,27,29); Key:BIAVGWDGIJKWRM-UHFFFAOYSA-N

Talnetant (SB-223,412) is a neurokinin 3 receptor antagonist developed by GlaxoSmithKline, which is being researched for several functions (primarily treatment of irritable bowel syndrome, despite a 2007 study finding no statistically significant improvement in rectal hypersensitivity over placebo). Its use as a potential antipsychotic drug for the treatment of schizophrenia has also been discontinued.

== See also ==
- Tachykinin receptor 3 § Agonists
- List of investigational antipsychotics
