= Neurokinin B =

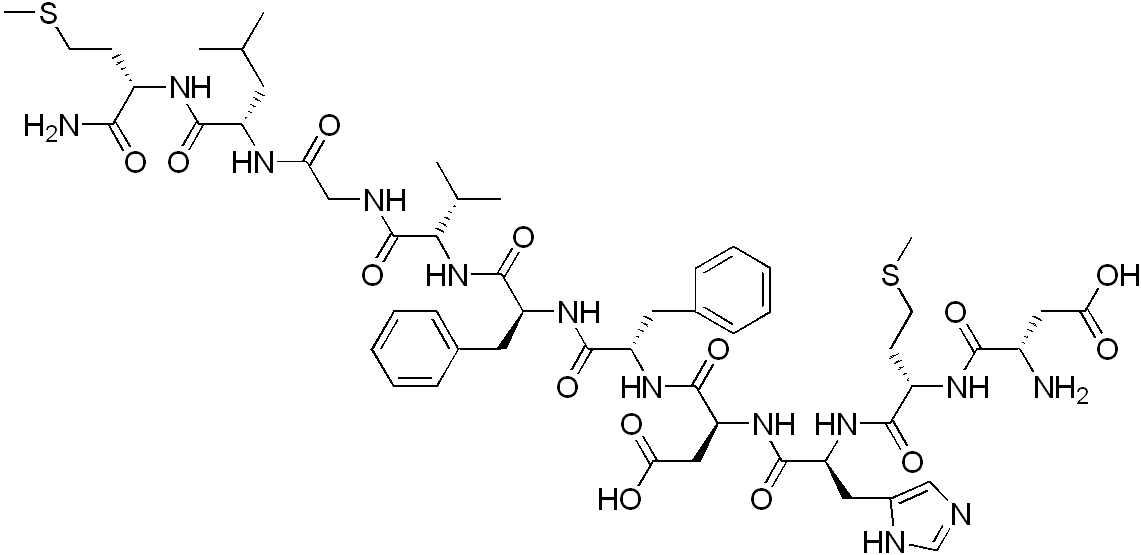

Identifiers
CAS Number	86933-75-7
3D model (JSmol)	Interactive image
ChemSpider	4470819
IUPHAR/BPS	2090
MeSH	Neurokinin+B
PubChem CID	55583
CompTox Dashboard (EPA)	DTXSID4040890
- InChI: InChI=1S/C55H79N13O14S2/c1-30(2)21-38(50(77)62-36(47(57)74)17-19-83-5)61-43(69)28-59-55(82)46(31(3)4)68-54(81)40(23-33-15-11-8-12-16-33)65-51(78)39(22-32-13-9-7-10-14-32)64-53(80)42(26-45(72)73)67-52(79)41(24-34-27-58-29-60-34)66-49(76)37(18-20-84-6)63-48(75)35(56)25-44(70)71/h7-16,27,29-31,35-42,46H,17-26,28,56H2,1-6H3,(H2,57,74)(H,58,60)(H,59,82)(H,61,69)(H,62,77)(H,63,75)(H,64,80)(H,65,78)(H,66,76)(H,67,79)(H,68,81)(H,70,71)(H,72,73)/t35-,36-,37-,38-,39-,40-,41-,42-,46-/m0/s1 Key: NHXYSAFTNPANFK-HDMCBQFHSA-N; InChI=1/C55H79N13O14S2/c1-30(2)21-38(50(77)62-36(47(57)74)17-19-83-5)61-43(69)28-59-55(82)46(31(3)4)68-54(81)40(23-33-15-11-8-12-16-33)65-51(78)39(22-32-13-9-7-10-14-32)64-53(80)42(26-45(72)73)67-52(79)41(24-34-27-58-29-60-34)66-49(76)37(18-20-84-6)63-48(75)35(56)25-44(70)71/h7-16,27,29-31,35-42,46H,17-26,28,56H2,1-6H3,(H2,57,74)(H,58,60)(H,59,82)(H,61,69)(H,62,77)(H,63,75)(H,64,80)(H,65,78)(H,66,76)(H,67,79)(H,68,81)(H,70,71)(H,72,73)/t35-,36-,37-,38-,39-,40-,41-,42-,46-/m0/s1 Key: NHXYSAFTNPANFK-HDMCBQFHBC
- SMILES: CC(C)C[C@@H](C(=O)N[C@@H](CCSC)C(=O)N)NC(=O)CNC(=O)[C@H](C(C)C)NC(=O)[C@H](Cc1ccccc1)NC(=O)[C@H](Cc2ccccc2)NC(=O)[C@H](CC(=O)O)NC(=O)[C@H](Cc3c[nH]cn3)NC(=O)[C@H](CCSC)NC(=O)[C@H](CC(=O)O)N

Properties
Chemical formula	C_{55}H_{79}N_{13}O_{14}S_{2}
Molar mass	1210.43
- Except where otherwise noted, data are given for materials in their standard state (at 25 °C [77 °F], 100 kPa). verify (what is ?) Infobox references

Neurokinin B (NKB), also called neuromedin K, is a signaling peptide that in humans is encoded by the gene TAC3. It is part of the tachykinin peptide family, and is implicated in a variety of human functions and pathways such as the secretion of gonadotropin-releasing hormone. Additionally, NKB is associated with pregnancy in females and maturation in young adults. Reproductive function is highly dependent on levels of both neurokinin B and also the G-protein coupled receptor ligand kisspeptin. The first NKB studies done attempted to resolve why high levels of the peptide may be implicated in pre-eclampsia during pregnancy. NKB, kisspeptin, and dynorphin together are found in the arcuate nucleus (ARC) known as the KNDy subpopulation. This subpopulation is targeted by many steroid hormones and works to form a network that feeds back to GnRH pulse generator.

== Synthesis ==
Neurokinin B is found in humans as a ten-peptide chain (decapeptide) attached to a terminal amide group. The peptide formula is H-Asp-Met-His-Asp-Phe-Phe-Val-Gly-Leu-Met-NH2 (DMHDFFVGLM-NH2). Neurokinin B (NKB), is encoded by the TAC3 gene in humans, while the corresponding gene in rodents is inconsistently written as either Tac2 or Tac3. Neurokinin B is expressed along with the peptides kisspeptin and dynorphin A in the neuronal cells of the arcuate nucleus. Five exon segments in the TAC3 gene encode for the NKB precursor known as preprotachykinin B. Preprotachykinin B is then proteolytically cleaved into the pro-peptide proneurokinin B. A second proteolytic cleavage of proneurokinin B produces the final product neurokinin B.

== Role in humans ==
During the ovarian cycle, GnRH secretion along with that of luteinizing hormone (LH) is highly regulated. This regulation occurs by a negative feedback system. Neurokinin B along with its sister peptides of the KNDy subpopulation regulate this feedback. The NK3R receptor group when activated with a synthetic agonist of NKB, senktide, has been shown to stimulate the secretion of luteinizing hormone. In addition, studies have shown that NKB plays a larger role in females than in males. It has been found that in brain of females, the arcuate nucleus contains twice as many connections to NKB neurons than males.

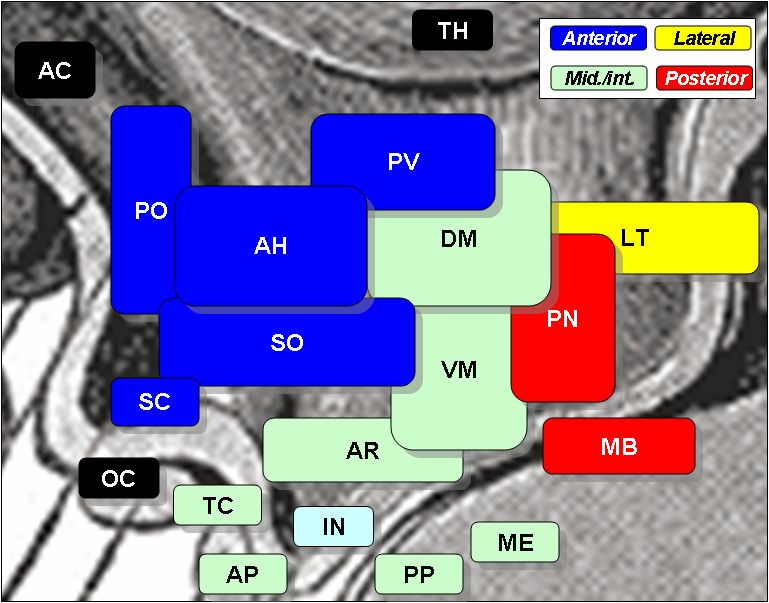
Arcuate nucleus shown as AR

== Receptors ==
The main receptor neurokinin B interacts with is the neurokinin 3 receptor (NK3R). The Neurokinin 3 receptor is a part of a larger family of G-protein coupled receptors that binds all tachykinin proteins. While neurokinin B has the ability to bind to other Neurokinin receptors, the highest affinity lies in that of the NK3R receptor group. Much like the neurokinin B peptide, the NK3R receptor that it binds to is encoded within five exons of the TACR3 gene in humans and the Tacr3 gene in mice and other rodents. High concentrations of the NK3R receptor are found in both the central nervous system and the spinal cord. Additional NK3R receptors have also been found in various other places in the body including: uterus, mesenteric vein, gut neurons, and placenta. Neurokinin B has also been found to co-localize certain gonadal steroid hormone receptors. These include the estrogen receptor (ERα), progesterone receptor (PR), and androgen receptor. It has been found that co-localization of the NKB neurons near these receptors is at a much higher concentration than even that of other peptides and chemicals. The kisspeptin, neurokinin B, and dynorphin cell groups are found to be co-localized to more than 95% of all of the aforementioned receptors in the arcuate nucleus.

== Role of gonadotropin-releasing hormone ==
Mutations or defects in the TAC3 or TACR3 gene can lead to steroidal feedback problems in the GnRH pulse generator loop, causing GnRH to be understimulated. Lack of GnRH ultimately leads to hypogonadism. A review of neurokinin B and its sister peptides, kisspeptin and dynorphin, in sheep found that these KNDy cell groups (kisspeptin, neurokinin B, dynorphin), are in direct contact with the GnRH neuronal bodies in both the preoptic area and the mediobasal hypothalamus. Researchers found this to be feature to be conserved among species including humans. Due to the high percentage of co-localization found with neurokinin B cell bodies and receptor groups, it is suggested that Neurokinin B along with kisspeptin and dynorphin play a role in the release of GnRH. These findings are important since GnRH release plays such a pivotal role in regulating hormonal control in the bodies of humans.

== Role in pre-eclampsia ==
Pre-eclampsia is a disorder found in around 5% of pregnant women, usually presenting in the 37th week of gestation, with prognosis ranging from mild to severe. While mild forms of the disease do not significantly impact mother or fetus, more severe cases may lead to blood vessel constriction, increased blood pressure, and reduced blood flow. This in turn can damage various organ systems including the brain, liver, kidneys, and heart. Dangers to the fetus occur when restricted blood flow due to high pressures causes a lack of blood flow to the uterus. This can result in a number of problems for the fetus including poor growth, lack of amniotic fluid, and placental abruption.

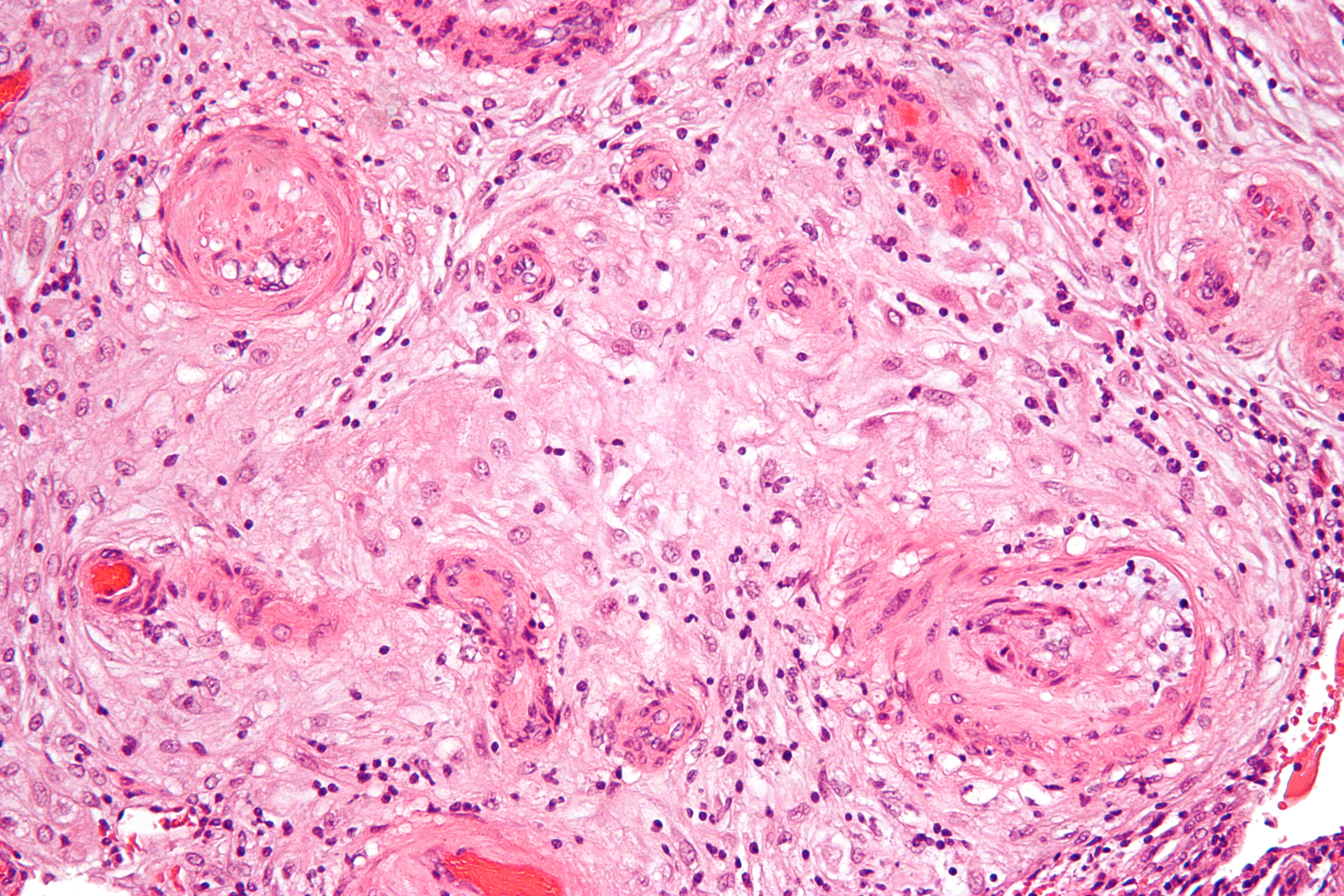
H&E stain of placenta during pre-eclampsia

The cause of pre-eclampsia is not known. Research indicates that the tachykinin peptide neurokinin B may play a role, as placental expression of the TAC3 gene, which codes for NKB, was found in high levels in women with pre-eclampsia.

Usually not located in peripheral tissue, high levels of TAC3 gene were found in both maternal plasma and placental blood, including blood from the umbilical cord. TAC3 in this case was able to secrete NKB in order to affect the circulation of the fetus. Additional studies done on rodents introduced to high levels of NKB indicated the vasoregulatory properties of the peptide, such as the vasoconstriction found in cases of pre-eclampsia.

Increased NKB secretions seem to be caused by defective implantation or invasion of the embryo at the trophoblast stage. In most cases of pre-eclampsia, the trophoblast was unable to fully invade into the uterine lining and has been an almost constant feature in documented cases. This leads to increased signaling of NKB factors. In cases of defective implantation, NKB is vital to increase blood flow to the placenta. However, it seems as though depending on which receptor NKB binds, the peptide can cause both constriction and dilation of the blood vessels. The NK1 receptor was studied and found to cause vasodilation while the NK3 receptor was found to cause vasoconstriction. Higher levels of NK3 receptor seem to be found in pregnant woman suffering from pre-eclampsia. NKB usually found in the brain, has been found in the placenta at a concentration of 2.6 times that of the NKB in the brain, possibly leading to the onset of pre-eclampsia in mothers.

== Studies in non-human animals ==
Much like the human TAC3 gene, Tac3 (also called Tac2) in rodents facilitates the expression of the neurokinin B peptide. Rodent studies have been done and compared to human studies to elucidate the function of NKB. For cases in which human studies are not possible, rodent studies are substituted due to the conserved similarity between TAC3 and Tac3, and NKB with the TACR3 and Tacr2 receptor genes.

Studies show that in postmenopausal woman there is an increased expression of tachykinin neurons in the arcuate nucleus.

In order to replicate the condition of the post-menopausal woman, an ovariectomized rat is used. The removal of the ovaries simulates the condition of menopause in rats and allows for comparative studies to be done. It was found that in these ovariectomized rats there was a significant increase in the number of NKB neurons in the arcuate nucleus.

Along with rats, primate studies have been done, investigating the effects of NKB and the other peptides of the KNDy subpopulation. Due to the similarity in brain structure monkeys have been good research candidates. In humans, as previously mentioned, NKB signaling plays a vital role in hormone secretion, especially that of luteinizing hormone before the onset of puberty. It was shown, in monkeys, that activation of NK3R, the NKB receptor, was associated with release of hormones that come before the onset of puberty. This included initial release of GnRH. NKB found mostly in the arcuate nucleus in humans, is found mostly in the monkey hypothalamus. By injecting NKB analogs pulsatile GnRH was secreted, activating the hypothalmic-pituitary axis and therefore releasing LH. Researchers found these results consistent across both monkey and human brains.
