= Perimenopause =

Period of physical and psychological changes preceding menopause

Perimenopause is the phase during which the ovaries gradually reduce their hormonal activity, a period of physical and psychological changes preceding menopause. It begins with a persistent difference of seven days or more in the length of consecutive menstrual cycles and it ends after the occurrence of one year of amenorrhea, when menopause is reached. The fluctuating hormone levels, particularly variations in the level of circulating estrogen, can cause a wide range of symptoms, including heavy and irregular bleeding, mood and memory changes, decreased libido, vasomotor symptoms and genitourinary symptoms. Perimenopause is a normal part of reproductive aging rather than a disease.

== Signs and symptoms ==
The most commonly reported symptoms include hot flashes, sleep changes, vaginal dryness, and adverse mood. While these are the most commonly discussed perimenopausal symptoms, women may experience many others, and the type and severity of symptoms vary widely among individuals.

=== Hot flashes and night sweats ===
Hot flashes and night sweats, together known as vasomotor symptoms, are among the most common symptoms of perimenopause. Moderate to severe vasomotor symptoms often begin during perimenopause and last on average seven to eleven years.

=== Sleep changes ===
Sleep changes are another perimenopausal symptom that can affect the quality of life of women in their early perimenopausal stage. Studies indicate that insomnia is more common during perimenopause than before it. Although women begin to notice sleep changes in their 40s, they become worse with the menopausal transition. However, there is no clear consensus on whether these changes in sleep pattern are directly related to menopause or due to estrogen withdrawal or other hormonal changes, or simply related to ageing. The hot flashes at night are one cause of sleep disturbance.

=== Vaginal dryness and reduced libido ===
Although vaginal dryness or dyspareunia is a common issue reported among postmenopausal women, women in their perimenopausal stage also experience vaginal dryness, even though the estrogen levels are not consistently low as in postmenopause. Unlike hot flashes and adverse moods, vaginal dryness and sleep difficulties are less likely to get better without ongoing treatment.

Reduced libido is also reported.

=== Adverse mood ===
Perimenopause is associated with an increased vulnerability to depressive symptoms and major depressive episodes compared with premenopause. A history of depression is a major risk factor. Depressive symptoms frequently co-occur with vasomotor symptoms, sleep disturbance and psychosocial stressors.

=== Cognition ===
Cognitive complaints such as "brain fog" and memory lapses are also reported. A 2026 meta-analysis of 26 studies found poorer cognitive outcomes in perimenopausal than in premenopausal women, although this effect appeared only in studies using the STRAW+10 staging criteria; overall, no difference was found compared with postmenopausal women.

== Diagnosis ==
Diagnosis is primarily clinical. In otherwise healthy women over 45, the UK National Institute for Health and Care Excellence (NICE) recommends diagnosing perimenopause based on vasomotor symptoms and irregular periods, without laboratory tests. Other causes of menstrual irregularity, such as pregnancy, thyroid disease and hyperprolactinemia, should be considered.

== Management ==
Menopausal hormone therapy is commonly used as a treatment for women who experience symptoms of perimenopause such as hot flashes, sleep disturbance, vaginal dryness and mood changes, and can improve the quality of life. However, most evidence on hormone therapy derives from postmenopausal populations, and it has not been specifically optimised for perimenopause. Women who experience irregular bleeding may benefit from oral contraceptives, which can also provide contraception, since pregnancy can occur during perimenopause.

=== Non-hormonal pharmacological options ===
Non-hormonal options for hot flashes include gabapentin and neurokinin 3 receptor antagonists such as fezolinetant. Selective serotonin reuptake inhibitors (SSRIs) and serotonin–norepinephrine reuptake inhibitors (SNRIs) can reduce hot flashes and are also used to treat perimenopausal depression.

=== Non-pharmacological approaches ===
Cognitive behavioral therapy (CBT) is also recommended for hot flashes.

== Society and culture ==
Historically, there has been limited public and clinical information about menopause and the perimenopausal transition, and awareness of perimenopause specifically remains low, although it is a life stage that most women who reach midlife will eventually go through.

Public discussion has expanded in recent years, with growing attention to its impact on quality of life and on workplace participation. A 2025 literature review for the UK Department for Work and Pensions found evidence that menopause symptoms can affect women’s confidence and wellbeing at work. The Menopause Society has issued workplace recommendations for employers, including flexible working arrangements and awareness training.
