= Hypothalamic–pituitary–gonadal axis =

Relationship between biological organs

Hypo gonadal axis

The hypothalamic–pituitary–gonadal axis (HPG axis, also known as the hypothalamic–pituitary–testicular/ovarian axis) refers to the hypothalamus, pituitary gland, and gonadal glands as if these individual endocrine glands were a single entity. Because these glands often act in concert, physiologists and endocrinologists find it convenient and descriptive to speak of them as a single system.

The HPG axis plays a critical part in the development and regulation of a number of the body's systems, such as the reproductive and immune systems. Fluctuations in this axis cause changes in the hormones produced by each gland and have various local and systemic effects on the body.

The axis controls development, reproduction, and aging in animals. Gonadotropin-releasing hormone (GnRH) is secreted from the hypothalamus by GnRH-expressing neurons. The anterior portion of the pituitary gland produces luteinizing hormone (LH) and follicle-stimulating hormone (FSH), and the gonads produce testosterone and estrogen.

In oviparous organisms (e.g. fish, reptiles, amphibians, birds), the HPG axis is commonly referred to as the hypothalamus-pituitary-gonadal-liver axis (HPGL-axis) in females. Many egg-yolk and chorionic proteins are synthesized heterologously in the liver, which are necessary for ovocyte growth and development. Examples of such necessary liver proteins are vitellogenin and choriogenin.

The HPA, HPG, and HPT axes are three pathways in which the hypothalamus and pituitary direct neuroendocrine function.

== Location and regulation ==
HPG regulation in males, with the inhibin/activin system playing a similar role on GnRH-producing cells

The hypothalamus is located in the brain and secretes GnRH. GnRH travels down the anterior portion of the pituitary via the hypophyseal portal system and binds to receptors on the secretory cells of the adenohypophysis. In response to GnRH stimulation these cells produce LH and FSH, which travel into the blood stream.

The pulsatile release of GnRH by hypothalamic neurons is necessary for adequate gonadotropin production by the pituitary. Continuous secretion of GnRH uncouples the gonads from pituitary regulation and leads to decreased synthesis of gonadotropins and hypogonadism. The frequency and amplitude of GnRH pulses are tightly regulated, particularly in women, over the course of the reproductive cycle. For instance, the FSHβ gene exhibits ultrasensitive behavior in response to GnRH pulse frequency, with its expression sharply increasing at lower pulse frequencies and decreasing at higher frequencies. This ultrasensitive response is enhanced by the involvement of multiple mitogen-activated protein kinases (MAPKs), including ERK1/2, JNK, p38, and ERK5, which form a complex network of feedback and feedforward loops. Different pulse frequencies of GnRH affect the production of gonadotropins, with rapid GnRH pulsatility promoting LH synthesis and slower pulsatility favoring FSH production. This ultrasensitive mechanism ensures that small changes in GnRH pulse frequency can lead to significant alterations in gonadotropin synthesis, thereby fine-tuning the reproductive endocrine system.

These two hormones play an important role in communicating to the gonads. In females FSH and LH act primarily to activate the ovaries to produce estrogen and inhibin and to regulate the menstrual cycle and ovarian cycle. Estrogen forms a negative feedback loop by inhibiting the production of GnRH in the hypothalamus. Inhibin acts to inhibit activin, which is a peripherally produced hormone that positively stimulates GnRH-producing cells. Follistatin, which is also produced in all body tissue, inhibits activin and gives the rest of the body more control over the axis. Interestingly, follistatin has been shown to also be upregulated by exercise to inhibit the inhibition of muscle growth by myostatin. This role of exercise in modulating activin inhibition and influencing the HPO axis presents a compelling direction for future exercise physiology research.

Kisspeptin helps to regulate the HPO axis by acting as a mediator. This neuropeptide, encoded by the KISS1 gene, primarily exerts its effects by binding to its receptor, KISS1R (also known as GPR54), on GnRH neurons in the hypothalamus. By stimulating GnRH release, kisspeptin indirectly promotes the secretion of LH and FSH from the pituitary gland. Two main populations of kisspeptin neurons have been identified in the hypothalamus: one in the arcuate nucleus (ARC) and another in the anteroventral periventricular nucleus (AVPV) in rodents, or the preoptic area (POA) in humans. These neurons are involved in both the negative and positive feedback mechanisms of estrogen on GnRH secretion, with ARC kisspeptin neurons mediating negative feedback and AVPV/POA neurons facilitating the preovulatory LH surge. Kisspeptin's influence extends beyond the hypothalamus, as it has been shown to have direct effects on the pituitary and ovaries, regulating processes such as follicle development, oocyte maturation, and ovulation. Dysregulation of the kisspeptin system has been implicated in various reproductive disorders, including polyendocrine metabolic ovarian syndrome (PMOS) and infertility, highlighting its importance in maintaining normal reproductive function. These kisspeptin neurons act as central processors for relaying signals from the periphery to GnRH neurons and are essential for the onset of puberty and maintenance of normal reproductive function.

In addition, leptin and insulin have stimulatory effects and ghrelin has inhibitory effects on gonadotropin-releasing hormone (GnRH) secretion from the hypothalamus. Kisspeptin also influences GnRH secretion.

Leptin, an adipocyte-derived hormone, exerts a stimulatory effect on GnRH secretion through multiple mechanisms. While GnRH neurons do not express leptin receptors directly, leptin influences GnRH neuronal activity indirectly via regulation of downstream mediators such as neuropeptide Y, α-melanocyte-stimulating hormone, and agouti-related peptide. Furthermore, leptin promotes GnRH function by acting on kisspeptin neurons, which regulate GnRH release as discussed previously. In the hypothalamus, leptin has been shown to accelerate GnRH secretion dose-dependently, specifically affecting pulse frequency rather than amplitude. At the pituitary level, leptin directly stimulates the release of LH and, to a lesser extent, FSH via nitric oxide synthase activation in gonadotropes.

Insulin, another metabolic hormone, also plays a significant role in modulating GnRH secretion. Central infusion of insulin has been associated with increased LH secretion in diabetic male sheep and female rats, suggesting a neuronal action of insulin in regulating LH release. Insulin receptor signaling in GnRH neurons has been shown to increase GnRH pulsatile secretion and consequent LH secretion, particularly in the context of obesity. This effect appears to be sexually dimorphic, with a more pronounced response observed in female rodents compared to males.

In contrast to the stimulatory effects of leptin and insulin, ghrelin exerts predominantly inhibitory effects on GnRH secretion. Ghrelin, commonly known as the "hunger hormone," has been shown to decrease the firing rate and burst frequency of GnRH neurons in a sex- and estrous cycle-dependent manner. This inhibitory effect is mediated through the growth hormone secretagogue receptor (GHS-R) expressed on GnRH neurons. Ghrelin's action on GnRH neurons involves a decrease in the frequency of GABAergic miniature postsynaptic currents and is dependent on retrograde endocannabinoid signaling. At the hypothalamic level, ghrelin has been demonstrated to inhibit GnRH secretion from hypothalamic fragments of ovariectomized female rats.

The integration of these metabolic signals ensures that reproduction occurs under favorable energetic conditions. Leptin serves as a permissive signal for puberty onset, with a threshold level necessary for normal pubertal progression. Insulin sensitivity in GnRH neurons is important for maintaining normal reproductive function, particularly in the face of metabolic challenges such as obesity. Ghrelin, on the other hand, acts as a signal of energy insufficiency, with persistently elevated levels potentially delaying the normal timing of puberty. Evolutionarily speaking, this makes sense as it is unwise for the body to spend excess energy that it does not have to grow the body larger. Additionally, the effects of these hormones on GnRH secretion can vary depending on the stage of the estrous cycle, nutritional status, and other physiological factors.

Estradiol, progesterone, LH, and FSH during the menstrual cycle.

From a larger picture, the HPO axis exhibits a concept known as bistability which is responsible for the maintenance of a cyclical pattern in ovarian activity. This bistability is most obvious in the transition between the follicular and luteal phases, and arises from interactions between positive and negative feedback loops involving GnRH, LH, FSH, estrogen, and progesterone. The kisspeptin system creates a switch-like mechanism driving the transition from negative to positive feedback. The distinct hormone profiles characterizing each phase represent two stable states, with sharp transitions between them ensuring proper timing of ovulation and endometrial preparation.

As previously stated, during the follicular phase, estrogen and LH levels rise, and entry into the luteal phase does not occur unless a surge in these hormones occurs up to a certain threshold. Progesterone levels remain low until after the surge, when they rise in the luteal phase. Throughout this cycle, inhibins provide a clear picture of bistability. These dimeric glycoprotein hormones, primarily produced by granulosa cells in the ovary, act as negative feedback regulators of FSH secretion from the anterior pituitary. During the follicular phase, inhibin B is the predominant form, with its levels rising in parallel to the growth of the dominant follicle. This increase in inhibin B, along with rising estrogen levels, contributes to the suppression of FSH secretion, which is critical for the selection of a single dominant follicle. As the cycle progresses to the luteal phase, inhibin A becomes the primary form produced by the corpus luteum. The declining steroid production by the corpus luteum and the dramatic fall of inhibin A towards the end of the luteal phase allow for FSH to rise during the last few days of the menstrual cycle. This elevation in FSH is important for the recruitment of a new cohort of ovarian follicles in the subsequent cycle.

After menstruation begins, FSH levels decrease due to estrogen's negative feedback and inhibin B produced by the developing follicle. FSH stimulates aromatase activity in granulosa cells, converting androgens to estrogen. As FSH levels drop, the surrounding follicles develop a more androgen-rich environment. Additionally, the granulosa cells of the dominant follicle release peptides that may inhibit the growth of nearby follicles through autocrine and paracrine mechanisms. The development of the dominant follicle occurs in three stages: recruitment, selection, and dominance. Recruitment happens during the first four days of the menstrual cycle when FSH stimulates the recruitment of a group of follicles from the non-growing pool. Between days 5 and 7, one follicle is selected to continue development while the others undergo atresia, a process influenced by anti-Müllerian hormone (AMH). By day 8, the selected follicle dominates by promoting its growth and inhibiting the development of others.

During the follicular phase, estradiol levels rise with follicle growth and granulosa cell proliferation. FSH receptors, present only on granulosa cells, increase in number due to cell population expansion, not receptor concentration per cell. Rising FSH and estradiol levels induce LH receptor formation on granulosa cells, enabling small progesterone and 17-OHP production, which enhances LH secretion. FSH also activates steroidogenic enzymes like aromatase and 3β-HSD. Meanwhile, LH receptors on theca cells stimulate androstenedione and testosterone production, which granulosa cells convert to estradiol, demonstrating the two-cell, two-gonadotropin hypothesis of estrogen synthesis. Follicular development then progresses through stages: primordial follicles enlarge into preantral follicles surrounded by granulosa and theca cells, acquiring FSH receptors. These develop into antral follicles and eventually preovulatory follicles. Early follicles produce more androgens due to 5α-reductase activity, but dominant follicles, with high aromatase levels, shift to an estrogen-rich environment, crucial for their selection.

The LH surge, as previewed earlier, is triggered by rising estradiol levels and occurs about 34-36 hours before ovulation. LH induces granulosa cell luteinization, progesterone synthesis, meiosis resumption, and oocyte release. Proteolytic enzymes and prostaglandins, activated by LH and progesterone, break down the follicular wall, releasing the oocyte. Ovulation typically occurs randomly between ovaries, with some studies suggesting higher fertility potential in right-sided ovulation.

Post-ovulation, the corpus luteum forms and secretes progesterone and estradiol episodically, regulated by LH. The corpus luteum's lifespan is influenced by LH pulse frequency and amplitude, gonadotropin levels, and luteotropic factors like prolactin, oxytocin, and prostaglandins. Luteolysis involves factors such as endothelin-1 and TNFα, which inhibit steroidogenesis and induce apoptosis. Estrogen and matrix metalloproteinases also contribute to luteal regression.

Disruptions in the bistable nature of the HPO axis have been implicated in various reproductive disorders. For instance, in polyendocrine metabolic ovarian syndrome (PMOS), alterations in the GnRH pulse generator and abnormal androgen feedback may lead to a persistent high-LH state. The GnRH pulse generator in PMOS then becomes less sensitive to the normal inhibitory effects of estrogen and progesterone leading to hyperandrogenism. The hyperandrogenism creates a self-perpetuating cycle, in which the increased GnRH pulse frequency promotes LH secretion over FSH, resulting in a high LH/FSH ratio. Elevated LH stimulates theca cells in the ovaries to produce excess androgens. These elevated androgens further impair the sensitivity of the GnRH pulse generator to negative feedback from estrogen and progesterone.

Conversely, hypothalamic amenorrhea is characterized by a failure to transition from the low-gonadotropin state to the active reproductive state, due to metabolic or stress-related factors such as overtraining commonly seen in elite athletes. In such a state, menses does not occur at all, rather than partially occur. Even upon return to normal diet or physical activity, the body may take months to years for menses to return to normal, almost as if the body hysterically remembers the previous state of energy deficiency. By preventing menses, the body initiates infertility so that a pregnancy does not occur and cause another source of energy demand.

Understanding the bistable nature of the HPO axis has significant implications for developing novel therapeutic approaches to restore normal reproductive function. For example, pulsatile GnRH administration has shown promise in restoring normal reproductive function in certain cases of hypothalamic amenorrhea by nudging the system back into its active state. Similarly, novel kisspeptin analogs are being developed to modulate the HPO axis more precisely, potentially offering new treatments for infertility and hormone-dependent cancers.

== Function ==
=== Reproduction ===
One of the most important functions of the HPG axis is to regulate reproduction by controlling the uterine and ovarian cycles. In females, the positive feedback loop between estrogen and luteinizing hormone help to prepare the follicle in the ovary and the uterus for ovulation and implantation. When the egg is released, the empty follicle sac begins to produce progesterone to inhibit the hypothalamus and the anterior pituitary thus stopping the estrogen-LH positive feedback loop.

During the follicular phase, rising estrogen levels from developing follicles exert positive feedback on the hypothalamus and pituitary, leading to the LH surge that triggers ovulation. After ovulation, the corpus luteum produces progesterone, which inhibits GnRH secretion from the hypothalamus and gonadotropin release from the anterior pituitary, thus terminating the estrogen-LH positive feedback loop.

If conception occurs, the placenta will take over the secretion of progesterone; therefore the mother cannot ovulate again. If conception does not occur, decreasing excretion of progesterone will allow the hypothalamus to restart secretion of GnRH. These hormone levels also control the uterine (menstrual) cycle causing the proliferation phase in preparation for ovulation, the secretory phase after ovulation, and menstruation when conception does not occur. The activation of the HPG axis in both males and females during puberty also causes individuals to acquire secondary sex characteristics. This process, known as gonadarche, is preceded by adrenarche, the maturation of the adrenal glands, which contributes to the production of androgens responsible for some pubertal changes.

In males, the production of GnRH, LH, and FSH are similar, but the effects of these hormones are different. FSH stimulates sustentacular cells to release androgen-binding protein, which promotes testosterone binding. LH binds to the interstitial cells, causing them to secrete testosterone. Testosterone is required for normal spermatogenesis and inhibits the hypothalamus. Inhibin is produced by the spermatogenic cells, which, also through inactivating activin, inhibits the hypothalamus. After puberty these hormones levels remain relatively constant.

=== Life cycle ===
The activation and deactivation of the HPG axis also helps to regulate life cycles. At birth FSH and LH levels are elevated, and females also have a lifetime supply of primary oocytes. These levels decrease and remain low through childhood. During puberty the HPG axis is activated by the secretions of estrogen from the ovaries or testosterone from the testes. This activation of estrogen and testosterone causes physiological and psychological changes. Once activated, the HPG axis continues to function in men for the rest of their life but becomes deregulated in women, leading to menopause. This deregulation is caused mainly by the lack of oocytes that normally produce estrogen to create the positive feedback loop. Over several years, the activity the HPG axis decreases and women are no longer fertile. Beyond infertility, the diminished level of estrogen causes other effects such as increased bone resorption, unfavorable lipid profiles, hair loss, and skin dryness.

Although males remain fertile until death, the activity of the HPG axis decreases. As males age, the testes begin to produce less testosterone, leading to a condition known as post-pubertal hypogonadism. The cause of the decreased testosterone is unclear and a current topic of research. Post-pubertal hypogonadism results in progressive muscle mass decrease, increase in visceral fat mass, loss of libido, impotence, decreased attention, increased risk of fractures, and abnormal sperm production.

=== Sexual dimorphism and behavior ===
Sex steroids also affect behavior, because sex steroids affect the brains structure and functioning. During development, hormones help determine how neurons synapse and migrate to result in sexual dimorphisms. These physical differences lead to differences in behavior. While GnRH has not been shown to have any direct influence on regulating brain structure and function, gonadotropins, sex steroids, and activin have been shown to have such effects. It is thought that FSH may have an important role in brain development and differentiation.

Testosterone levels have been shown to relate to prosocial behavior. This helps create synaptogenesis by promoting neurite development and migration. Activin promotes neural plasticity throughout the lifespan and regulates the neurotransmitters of peripheral neurons. Environment can also affect hormones and behavior interaction.

== Clinical relevance ==
=== Disorders ===
Disorders of the hypothalamic–pituitary–gonadal axis are classified by the World Health Organization (WHO) as:

- WHO group I of ovulation disorders: Hypothalamic–pituitary failure
- WHO group II of ovulation disorders: Hypothalamic–pituitary dysfunction. WHO group II is the most common cause of ovulation disorders, and the most common causative member is polyendocrine metabolic ovarian syndrome (PMOS).

==== Gene mutations ====
Genetic mutations and chromosomal abnormalities are two sources of HPG axis alteration. Single mutations usually lead to changes in binding ability of the hormone and receptor leading to inactivation or over activation. These mutations can occur in the genes coding for GnRH, LH, and FSH or their receptors. Depending on which hormone and receptor are unable to bind different effects occur but all alter the HPG axis.

For example, the male mutation of the GnRH coding gene could result in hypogonadotrophic hypogonadism. A mutation that causes a gain of function for LH receptors can result in a condition known as testotoxicosis, which causes puberty to occur between ages 2–3 years. Loss of function of LH receptors can cause male pseudohermaphroditism. In females mutations would have analogous effects. Hormone replacement can be used to initiate puberty and continue if the gene mutation occurs in the gene coding for the hormone. Chromosomal mutations tend to affect the androgen production rather than the HPG axis.

=== Suppression ===
The HPG axis can be suppressed by hormonal birth control administration. Although often described as preventing pregnancy by mimicking the pregnancy state, hormonal birth control is effective because it works on the HPG axis to mimic the luteal phase of a woman's cycle. The primary active ingredients are synthetic progestins, which mimic biologically derived progesterone. The synthetic progestin prevents the hypothalamus from releasing GnRH and the pituitary from releasing LH and FSH; therefore it prevents the ovarian cycle from entering the menstrual phase and prevents follicle development and ovulation. Also as a result, many of the side effects are similar to the symptoms of pregnancy. Alzheimer's has been shown to have a hormonal component, which could possibly be used as a method to prevent the disease. Male contraceptives utilizing sex hormones approach the problem in a similar way.

The HPG axis can also be suppressed by GnRH antagonists or continuous administration of GnRH agonist, such as in the following applications

- Ovarian suppression as breast cancer management, to prevent the body's formation of estrogen which may stimulate breast cancer cells. This is generally done by continuous administration of GnRH agonist.
- Ovulation suppression as part of controlled ovarian hyperstimulation in in vitro fertilization, in order to prevent the spontaneous ovulation of ovarian follicles before they can be harvested.

=== Stimulation ===
Ovulation induction is usually initially performed by giving an antiestrogen such as clomifene citrate or letrozole in order to decrease negative feedback on the pituitary gland, resulting in an increase in FSH with the aim of increasing folliculogenesis. It is the main initial medical treatment for anovulation.

== Environment factors ==
Environment can have large impact on the HPG axis. For example, women with eating disorders tend to have oligomenorrhea (prolonged menstrual cycles greater than 35 days) and secondary amenorrhea (absence of menstruation for at least three consecutive months). Starvation from anorexia nervosa or bulimia causes the HPG axis to deactivate causing women's ovarian and uterine cycles to stop. Stress, physical exercise, and weight loss have been correlated with oligomenorrhea and secondary amenorrhea. Similarly environmental factors can also affect men such as stress causing impotence. Prenatal exposure to alcohol can affect the hormones regulating fetal development resulting in foetal alcohol spectrum disorder.

These menstrual irregularities are primarily caused by the deactivation of the HPG axis due to chronic energy deficiency and malnutrition associated with these disorders:

In anorexia nervosa, severe caloric restriction and subsequent weight loss lead to a suppression of the HPG axis. This suppression results in changes to the pulsatile release of GnRH from the hypothalamus, reverting the LH secretion pattern to pre-pubertal levels. The altered GnRH pulsatility leads to a decrease in the frequency and amplitude of LH and FSH release from the pituitary gland. Without adequate stimulation from these gonadotropins, ovarian follicles fail to develop properly, leading to insufficient estrogen production and anovulation. The starvation state in anorexia nervosa also affects other hormones important ore productive regulation. Leptin, an adipocyte-derived hormone discussed under the Regulation section of this Wikipedia page, is significantly reduced in patients with anorexia nervosa due to the loss of body fat. Low leptin levels contribute to the disruption of normal GnRH secretion, as leptin is needed for proper hypothalamic function and the initiation of puberty.

In bulimia nervosa, while patients may not always present with significant weight loss, the cycle of binge eating and purging can still lead to metabolic disturbances that affect the HPG axis. The irregular eating patterns and potential nutritional deficiencies can cause hormonal imbalances, particularly in insulin and testosterone levels, which may contribute to menstrual irregularities. Furthermore, the psychological stress associated with bulimia nervosa can activate the HPA axis, leading to elevated cortisol levels that can interfere with normal reproductive function.

== Comparative anatomy ==
The HPG axis is highly conserved in the animal kingdom. While reproductive patterns may vary, the physical components and control mechanisms remain the same. The same hormones are used with some minor evolutionary modifications. Much of the research is done on animal models, because they mimic so well the control mechanism of humans. It is important to remember humans are the only species to hide their fertile period, but this effect is a difference in the effect of the hormones rather than a difference in the HPG axis.

== See also ==
- Hypothalamic–pituitary–adrenal axis
- Hypothalamic–pituitary–thyroid axis
- Hypothalamic–neurohypophyseal system
- Neuroendocrinology
- Reproductive endocrinology
