= Kisspeptin =

Mammalian protein

KISS1

Identifiers
- Aliases: KISS1, HH13, KiSS-1, KiSS-1 metastasis-suppressor, KiSS-1 metastasis suppressor
- External IDs: OMIM: 603286; MGI: 2663985; GeneCards: KISS1

Gene location (Human)
Chr.	Chromosome 1 (human)
Band	1q32.1	Start	204,190,341 bp
Band	1q32.1	End	204,196,491 bp

Gene location (Mouse)
Chr.	Chromosome 1 (mouse)
Band	1|1 E4	Start	133,249,613 bp
Band	1|1 E4	End	133,257,639 bp
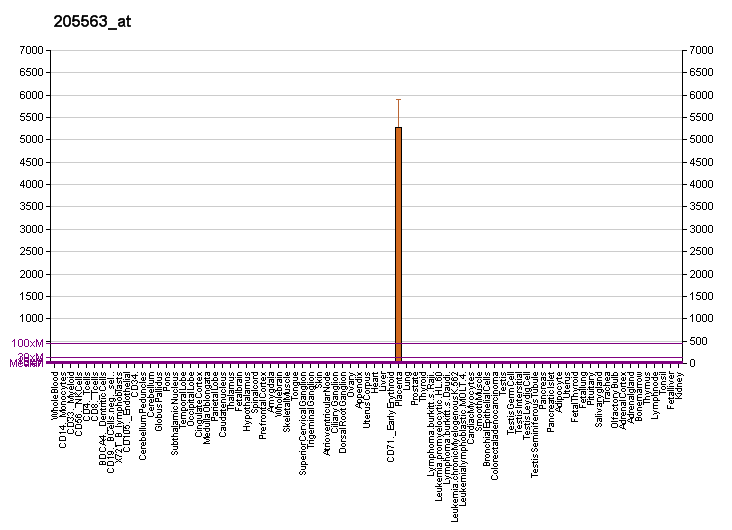
RNA expression pattern
Bgee	Human / Mouse (ortholog); Top expressed in: placenta; right lobe of liver; olfactory zone of nasal mucosa; nucleus accumbens; right testis; left testis; pituitary gland; putamen; mucosa of transverse colon; duodenum / Top expressed in: periventricular zone of hypothalamus; arcuate nucleus; preoptic area; embryo; striatum of neuraxis; muscle of thigh; lung; conceptus; liver; placenta; More reference expression data
BioGPS	More reference expression data
Gene ontology
Molecular function	protein binding; kisspeptin receptor binding
Cellular component	extracellular region; apical plasma membrane; cytoplasm; soma; neuron projection; extracellular space
Biological process	negative regulation of cell population proliferation; positive regulation of synaptic transmission; positive regulation of MAPK cascade; positive regulation of cytosolic calcium ion concentration involved in phospholipase C-activating G protein-coupled signaling pathway; positive regulation of luteinizing hormone secretion; positive regulation of cytosolic calcium ion concentration; positive regulation of growth hormone secretion; cytoskeleton organization; generation of ovulation cycle rhythm; G protein-coupled receptor signaling pathway
Sources:Amigo / QuickGO
Orthologs
Databases	NCBI: entry; OMA: entry
Species	Human	Mouse
Entrez	3814	280287
Ensembl	ENSG00000170498	ENSMUSG00000116158
UniProt	Q15726	Q6Y4S4
RefSeq (mRNA)	NM_002256	NM_178260
RefSeq (protein)	NP_002247	NP_839991
Location (UCSC)	Chr 1: 204.19 – 204.2 Mb	Chr 1: 133.25 – 133.26 Mb
PubMed search
- Wikidata
View/Edit Human	View/Edit Mouse

Kisspeptins (including kisspeptin-54 (KP-54), formerly known as metastin) are proteins encoded by the KISS1 gene in humans. Kisspeptins are ligands of the G-protein coupled receptor, GPR54. Kiss1 was originally identified as a human metastasis suppressor gene that has the ability to suppress melanoma and breast cancer metastasis. Kisspeptin-GPR54 signaling has an important role in initiating secretion of gonadotropin-releasing hormone (GnRH) at puberty, the extent of which is an area of ongoing research. Gonadotropin-releasing hormone is released from the hypothalamus to act on the anterior pituitary triggering the release of luteinizing hormone (LH), and follicle stimulating hormone (FSH). These gonadotropic hormones lead to sexual maturation and gametogenesis. Disrupting GPR54 signaling can cause hypogonadotrophic hypogonadism in rodents and humans. The Kiss1 gene is located on chromosome 1. It is transcribed in the brain, adrenal gland, liver, gonads, and pancreas.

== History ==
In 1996, Danny Welch's lab in Hershey, Pennsylvania, isolated a cDNA from a cancer cell that was not able to undergo metastasis after the human chromosome 6 was added to the cell. This gene was named KISS1 because of the location of where it was discovered (Hershey, Pennsylvania, home of Hershey's Kisses). Introduction of this chromosome into the once active cancer cell inhibited it from spreading and the cDNA responsible was taken from that cell. The fact that KISS1 was responsible for this was proved when it was transfected into melanoma cells and yet again, metastasis was suppressed. Later, a breakthrough would occur not involving Kisspeptin, but with its receptor.

Three years later in 1999, a G protein coupled receptor was identified in rat, cloned, and termed GPR54. Additionally, two years later, this receptor's ortholog in humans would be isolated. Using the identified receptors, endogenous ligands were isolated from cells (HEK293, B16-BL6, and CHO-K1 cells) that had these receptors inserted into them. The next step in the history of Kisspeptin involved revealing more of its pathways and the mechanism involved.

Kisspeptin was found to play a role in hypogonadotropic hypogonadism in 2003, which was supported by several independent lab groups. A mutation in GPR54 was considered responsible for this abnormality because those who held this mutation, or were missing GPR54 altogether, had problems in gonadal development during puberty. Several other phenotypes related to this mutation included a lower concentration of sex steroid and gonadotropin in the circulating blood and even sterility. These observations prompted the research on how kisspeptin is involved during the beginning of puberty. This research led to the discovery that kisspeptin stimulates the neurons that were involved in the release of gonadotropin-releasing hormone (GnRH) and possibly may have some impact on the release of luteinizing hormone (LH) and follicle-stimulating hormone (FSH).

Today, much effort is being made to characterize the regulation of kisspeptin and its gene expression, as well as to more specifically determine the mechanism behind kisspeptin's action on GnRH and LH release.

== Sources ==
=== Hippocampal dentate gyrus ===
Human hypothalamus (shown in red)

Kisspeptin is most notably expressed in the hypothalamus, but is also found in other areas of the brain including the hippocampal dentate gyrus. The hippocampus is known to integrate information on a person's spatial environment and memory. KISS1 is known to be expressed in the hippocampus. However, the levels of KISS1 mRNA expressed are decidedly lower than in the hypothalamus and amygdala. Studies have shown that the levels of KISS1 mRNA expressed in the hippocampus are proportional to less than half of the levels found in the hypothalamus. Despite this, it is suggested that expression of KISS1 is influenced by the gonad hormones similar to the hypothalamus. There is a high degree of expression of GPR54 in the hippocampus. The density of GPR54 is not discernable in pyramidal cells, but has high levels of expression in the granule cell layer. It is known to be found in specific nuclei and neurons.

=== Adrenal gland ===
The neuropeptide kisspeptin plays an important role in reproduction, but also stimulates aldosterone secretion from the adrenal cortex. Kisspeptin is distributed from the adrenal cortex and it is transcribed in the neocortex. The exact nature of the expression of kisspeptins in human adrenal glands unfortunately has not been fully clarified yet and remains a large topic of research among many scientists.

== Genomics ==
Kisspeptin is a product of the KISS1 gene which is cleaved from an initial 145 amino acid protein to a 54 amino acid long peptide. This gene is located on the long arm of chromosome 1 (1q32) and has four exons of which the 5' and 3' exons only partly undergo translation. The KISS1 gene was first isolated as a tumor spreading gene by investigators and named metastin. Metastin is derived from the protein kisspeptin and is a natural ligand of the receptor known as GPR54. Different types made up of 14 and 13 amino acids have been isolated and they each share a common C-terminal sequence. These N-terminally truncated peptides are known as the kisspeptins and belong to a larger family of peptides known as RFamides which all share a common arginine-phenylalanine-NH2 motif at their C-terminus. Among these conserved amino acids are arginine and phenylalanine residues, which are paired in this family of peptides. Also within this conserved family is a C-terminus that has an amide added to it. This family which kisspeptin includes prolactin releasing peptide and gonadotropin releasing inhibiting hormone.

A polymorphism in the terminal exon of this mRNA results in two protein isoforms. An adenosine present at the polymorphic site represents the third position in a stop codon. When the adenosine is absent, a downstream stop codon is used, and the encoded protein extends for an additional seven amino acid residues.

== Structure ==
=== Kisspeptin ===
The gene for kisspeptin codes for a peptide that can be cleaved into several pieces. In humans, one of these pieces is made up of 54 amino acids, while in mice it is made up of 52 amino acids. This fragment is then proteolytically processed into several smaller fragments that have been isolated in humans composed of 13 and 14 amino acids (kisspeptin-13 and kisspeptin-14 respectively). Each of these fragments has a similar conserved region at the C-terminal sequence consisting of ten amino acids. Specifically, positions 2, 4, 6, 7, 8, and 9 in this region are completely conserved where any variation seen is due to random mutations. The sequence on the carboxy terminal side of the conserved region is a well-known site for cleavage in neuropeptides.

=== GPR54 ===
The structure for GPR54 is very similar throughout many different vertebrates. It is composed of 398 amino acids that form seven transmembrane domains, like most G-protein coupled receptors. Sequences found in transmembrane spanning regions one, four, and seven are all very highly conserved throughout species. Variation appears in the around the amino and C-terminal domains, which accounts for the different types of Kisspeptin receptors seen in various species.

== Pathway ==
=== GnRH release ===
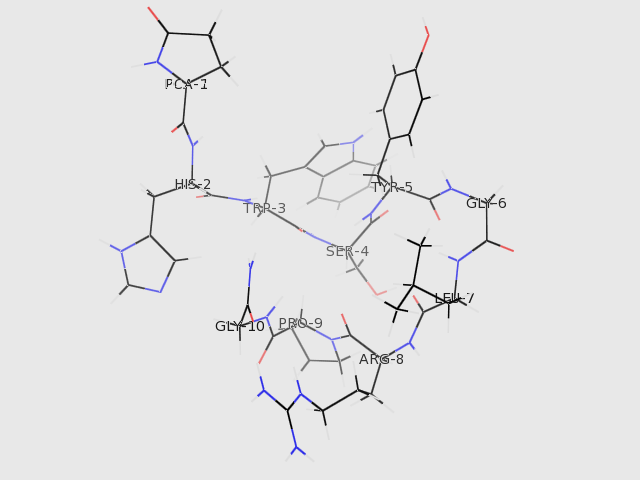
GNRH1 structure

Kisspeptin-54 interacts with G protein-coupled receptors, specifically GPR54 (Kiss1R). Other versions of kisspeptin are also able to interact with Kiss1R. Research in both rats and humans has provided evidence that the binding of kisspeptin stimulates PIP_{2} hydrolysis, Ca^{2+} mobilization, arachidonic acid release, extracellular signal-regulated protein kinase 1 (ERK1), ERK2, and p38 MAP kinase phosphorylation. Although GnRH is located in many areas such as the pituitary gland and the GnRH neurons, research proves that GnRH is highly dependent upon GnRH neuron activation and less dependent on the pituitary gonadotropes. Many studies show that kisspeptin has the ability to not only cause depolarization, but also excite many GnRH neurons, leading to high expression of kisspeptin in these genes. But, it is hypothesized that there are two different types of GFP-GnRH neurons due to expression in some neurons but not others, only one of which responds to kisspeptin. The neurons response to kisspeptin is also hypothesized to be related to age and puberty. The binding of kisspeptin to the GnRH receptor can have effects on puberty, tumor suppression and reproduction.

== Biological function ==
Kisspeptin can stimulate secretion of aldosterone and the release of insulin.

Kisspeptin appears to directly activate GnRH neurons. Evidence for this involves the persistence of a neural response to kisspeptin levels even in the presence of TTX, a neurotoxin that blocks nerve signals.

- Gramicidin-perforated patch recordings: about 30% of GnRH neurons respond to kisspeptin administration in prepubertal males, whereas 60% of GnRH neurons in adult mice responded.
- Because only adult mice respond to low doses of kisspeptin, it appears that GnRH neurons become developmentally activated by kisspeptin over the course of puberty.
- Kisspeptin induces production of LH and FSH, which are required for menstruation. Female athletes may not menstruate if they have low body fat levels; fat produces the hormone leptin, which induces production of kisspeptin.

=== Role in puberty ===
The onset of puberty is marked by an increase in gonadotropin secretion, which leads to sexual maturity and the ability to reproduce. Puberty can also be affected by a range of environmental factors, and is known to be affected by a person's metabolic capacity. Gonadotropin secretion is brought about and regulated by gonadotropin releasing hormone (GnRH). GnRH leads to the release of luteinizing hormone (LH) and follicle stimulating hormone (FSH), which primarily target the gonads to trigger puberty and reproduction. The primary event that leads to the beginning of puberty is the activation of GnRH neurons. This event is thought to involve kisspeptin/GPR54 signaling, which leads to the eventual activation of GnRH neurons. Several studies have confirmed that addition of kisspeptin to biological systems including rat, mouse, and sheep are able to bring about the release of LH and FSH.

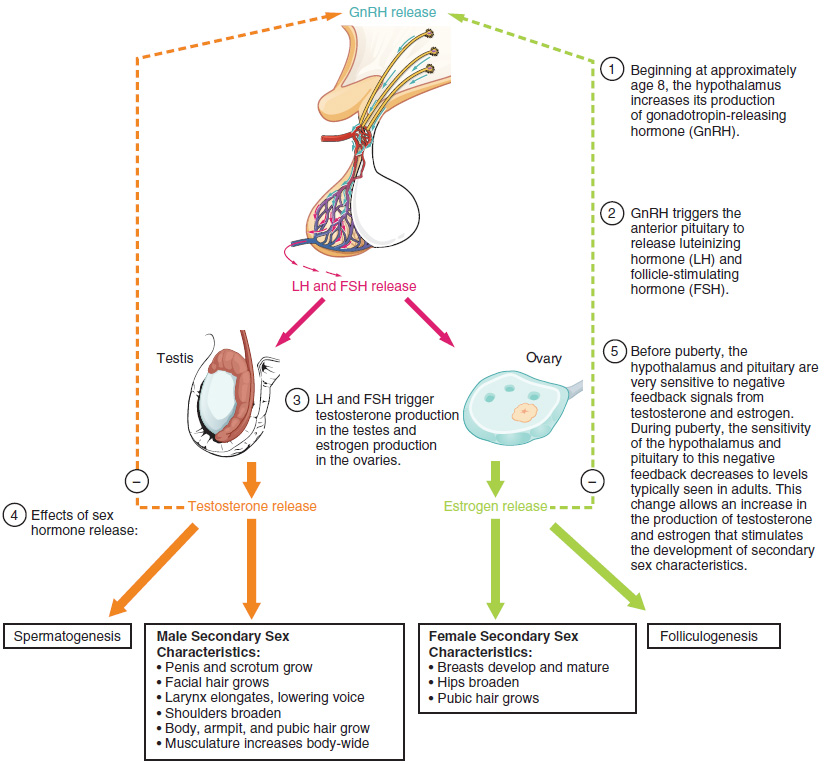
Figure 28 03 01

Kisspeptin's ability to stimulate the release of GnRH and gonadotropins is the result of its effect on GnRH release at the hypothalamus. In rat hypothalamus, it was found that over three-fourths of GnRH neurons coexpress the receptor for kisspeptin, GPR54, in their RNA. Kisspeptin was also able to bring about the release of GnRH both ex vivo and in vivo in rat and sheep. It can be concluded that by activating GnRH neurons in the hypothalamus, kisspeptin causes GnRH release which leads to the release of FSH and LH. The major role kisspeptin/GPR54 plays in sexual development was initially found in sexually immature humans and mice who had mutations that blocked the expression of the GPR54 gene. In rats, the initiation of puberty accompanied a greater presence of KISS1 and GPR54 in mRNA. The same events were later observed in mammals, where KISS1 and GPR54 mRNA increased more than twofold in the hypothalamus. This suggests that there is greater expression of KISS1 and potentially even GPR54 at the onset of puberty leading to an increase in kisspeptin/GPR54 signaling that results in the activation of the gonadotropin pathway. The addition of kisspeptin to female rats who had yet to mature led to the initiation of gonadotropin pathway. In humans, it was shown that females at the beginning stages of puberty had much higher kisspeptin levels than those females of the same age who had yet to begin puberty. It has been concluded that the activation of the GPR54/kisspeptin pathway is a catalyst that leads to puberty onset.

=== Role in tumor suppression ===
Kisspeptin plays a role in tumor suppression. In a study where malignant tumor cells were injected into a model system, the system was then tested for genes involved in the injected chromosome 6. KISS1 was discovered to be the only gene expressed in non-metastatic cells and absent in metastatic, metastatic meaning the ability for cancer to spread to unconnected areas. This suggested that Kisspeptin is an essential regulation factor in whether or not a cell will be metastatic or not. Additional experimentation identified CRSP3 as the exact gene responsible for KISS1 regulation within chromosome 6. In clinical evidence studies, KISS1 and Kisspeptin were found in primary metastatic tumors, and growing tumors showing decreased levels of KISS1 and Kisspeptin. In conclusion, kisspeptin plays a large role in tumor suppression. When it is active in cells the tumor stays consolidated and does not spread or grow.

=== Role in reproduction ===
Kisspeptin is highly expressed during pregnancy. In early-term placentas, GPR54 was expressed at a higher rate than placentas at-term. The expression of kisspeptin, however, remains unchanged in the placenta throughout pregnancy. The increased expression of GPR54 in early-term placentas is due to the increased presence of intrusive trophoblasts during the beginning of pregnancy. Term cells, by comparison are less invasive. When measuring kisspeptin-54 during pregnancy, a 1000x increase was observed in early pregnancy with a 10 000x increase seen by the third trimester. Following birth, kisspeptin-54 levels returned to normal, showing the placenta as the source of these increased kisspeptin levels.

Kisspeptin-54 has undergone early clinical trials as a potential medication for the treatment of low libido, with a single intravenous infusion of kisspeptin-54 being well tolerated and showing some evidence for efficacy in both men and women diagnosed with hypoactive sexual desire disorder.

=== Role in kidney function ===
Kisspeptin and its receptor was found in various sites in the kidney, including in the collecting duct, vascular smooth muscle, and in the renal tubule cells. Much of the impact on the kidney deals with the increased production of aldosterone in the adrenals glands stimulated by kisspeptin. Kisspeptin directly increases release of aldosterone by several means, the first being through these receptors leading to a direct route to aldosterone release. Secondly, the H295R adrenal cells stimulated by kisspeptin can synthesize aldosterone by breaking down pregnenolone more efficiently. Lastly, the kisspeptin-angiotensin II pathway of producing aldosterone is increased. Aldosterone that comes from the neighboring adrenal glands causes reabsorption of filtrate in order to retain water, leading to an increased blood pressure.

== Kisspeptin neurons ==
Kisspeptin expressing neurons are located in:

- Anteroventral periventricular nucleus (AVPV)
- Periventricular nucleus (PeN)
- Anterodorsal preoptic nucleus (ADP)
- The arcuate nucleus (Arc)

Kisspeptin-expressing neurons reside in the anteroventral periventricular nucleus and the arcuate nucleus, among others, and send projections into the MPOA, where there is an abundance of GnRH cell bodies. This anatomical evidence suggests that Kisspeptin fibers appear in close anatomical relationship to GnRH (parvicellular) neurons. In fact, Kisspeptin appears to act directly on GnRH neurons (via GPR54) to stimulate the secretion of GnRH.

However, for kisspeptin to be involved in the regulation of GnRH release, it must also be sensitive to circulating sex steroid levels, as it is established that steroids produced by the gonads exert regulatory effects on FSH and LH levels through GnRH mediation. Thus, there are at least two possible scenarios: that either kisspeptin neurons express sex steroid receptors themselves, or they receive input about circulating sex steroid levels from a different mechanism .

Coexpression imaging of KISS1 mRNA (using vector red) and steroid receptors determined that neurons that express KISS1 mRNA are targets for the action of sex steroids in both male and female mice.

== See also ==
- Neuropeptide VF precursor
- KNDy neuron
