= GnRH neuron =

Cell type

GnRH neurons, or gonadotropin-releasing hormone expressing neurons, are the cells in the hypothalamic infundibular nucleus in the brain that control the release of reproductive hormones from the pituitary. These brain cells control reproduction by secreting GnRH into the hypophyseal portal capillary bloodstream, so are sometimes referred to as "sex neurons". This small capillary network carries GnRH to the anterior pituitary, causing release of luteinizing hormone (LH) and follicle stimulating hormone (FSH) into the wider bloodstream. When GnRH neurons change their pattern of release from the juvenile to the adult pattern of GnRH secretion, puberty is initiated. Failure of GnRH neurons to form the proper connections, or failure to successfully stimulate the pituitary with GnRH, means that puberty is not initiated. These disruptions to the GnRH system cause reproductive disorders like hypogonadotropic hypogonadism or Kallmann Syndrome.

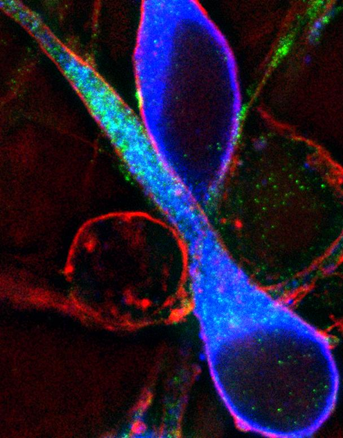
Fluorescence image of GnRH neurons (blue) with elements of their cellular cytoskeletons shown in red and green.

== Origins ==
In 1989, two research groups independently discovered that GnRH neurons, which in adults are scattered throughout the hypothalamus, do not originate in this region of the brain. Instead, they migrate into the brain along olfactory axon fibers from the nose. Most GnRH neurons are born from stem cells in the nasal placode (embryonic nasal tissue). More recently, it was discovered that a subset of GnRH neurons can trace their origins not from the nasal placode, but from the neural crest earlier in embryogenesis. This subset of cells migrates into the nasal placode, where they intermix with GnRH neurons born in this region, and migrate together into the brain.

== Cell migration ==
On their migration from the nose to the brain, GnRH neurons pass through nasal tissue, the early skull, and move through several regions of the forebrain before reaching their destinations. Along the way, secreted and membrane-bound molecules guide them in the right direction and help to set their movement speed. GnRH neurons that fail to enter the brain, or that migrate to the wrong brain region, are not functional and can even undergo programmed cell death. Failure of GnRH neurons to migrate into the brain is the main cause of Kallmann Syndrome. GABA, which depolarizes embryonic GnRH neurons, slows movement but helps them to move straight along their pathway. SDF activates hyperpolarizing GIRK channels, accelerating movement speeds. Other guidance cues like semaphorins and HGF also regulate the movement of GnRH neurons.

=== Movement ===
Scientists have discovered how guidance molecules cause GnRH neurons to speed up or slow down. Normally, any calcium ions in the cell are rapidly pulled into organelles like the mitochondria or endoplasmic reticulum. Guidance molecules cause the release of these calcium ions back into the cell cytoplasm, where calcium sensing proteins re-organize the cell's actin and microtubule cytoskeleton, which are the molecular filaments that give a cell its shape. This causes contractions in the cell (similar to muscle contractions) that link to adhesive proteins on the cell surface, pulling the cell forward.

== Physiology ==
The shift to high frequency electrical activity in GnRH neurons is the signal that initiates puberty. GnRH neurons receive input from classical neurotransmitters like glutamate and GABA. These neurotransmitters cause electrical activity that is regulated through development to cause broad changes in calcium ion entry into the cell through voltage-sensitive ion channels. This triggers the release of GnRH into the hypophyseal portal capillary bloodstream, where the GnRH hormone activates the pituitary to release luteinizing hormone and follicle stimulating hormone. In addition to classical neurotransmitters, some guidance molecules can change the wiring of GnRH neurons to the portal capillary system, altering the strength of the signal to the pituitary gland.

== Regulation ==
GnRH neurons integrate information from the body to regulate reproduction. The strongest activator of GnRH neurons is a hormone called kisspeptin. GnRH neurons also integrate information from the body through hormones like neuropeptide Y and adiponectin. These hormones provide the GnRH neurons with information about the body's status to help determine whether reproduction should be prioritized or suppressed.
