= Hot flash =

Physiological symptom

- Other names: Hot flush, vasomotor symptom
- Specialty: Gynecology, Endocrinology
- Symptoms: Feelings of intense heat on the face or chest, sweating, rapid heartbeat
- Duration: 2–30 minutes

Hot flash is a vasomotor symptom, often caused by the changing hormone levels that are characteristic of menopause. It is typically experienced as a feeling of intense heat with sweating and rapid heartbeat, and may typically last from two to 30 minutes for each occurrence. Hot flashes are the most commonly recognized menopausal symptom. Longer duration vasomotor symptoms are more often called hot flushes.

== Signs and symptoms ==
Hot flashes and night sweats are vasomotor symptoms, typically experienced as a feeling of intense heat with sweating and rapid heartbeat, and may typically last from two to thirty minutes for each occurrence, ending just as rapidly as they began. The sensation of heat usually begins in the face or chest, although it may appear elsewhere such as the back of the neck, and it can spread throughout the whole body. Some people feel as if they are going to faint. In addition to being an internal sensation, the surface of the skin, especially on the face, becomes hot to the touch. This is the origin of the alternative term "hot flush", since the sensation of heat is often accompanied by visible reddening of the face.

The hot-flash event may be repeated a few times each week or every few minutes throughout the day. Hot flashes may begin to appear several years before menopause starts and last for years afterwards. Some people undergoing menopause never have hot flashes. Others have mild or infrequent flashes. Those most affected experience dozens of hot flashes each day. In addition, hot flashes are often more frequent and more intense during hot weather or in an overheated room, the surrounding heat apparently making the hot flashes themselves both more likely to occur and more severe.

Severe hot flashes can make it difficult to get a full night's sleep (often characterized as insomnia), which in turn can affect mood, impair concentration, and cause other physical problems. When hot flashes occur at night, they are called "night sweats".

=== In menopause or perimenopause ===
As estrogen is typically lowest at night, some people get night sweats without having any hot flashes during the daytime. Roughly one-third of females experience night sweating alone, whereas about one-third of females experience night-sweats in combination with hot flushes.

=== Young females ===
Hot flashes can occur at other times in a young female's menstrual cycle, and may be a symptom of a problem with the pituitary gland. In younger females who are surgically menopausal, hot flashes are generally more intense than in older females, and they may last until natural age at menopause.

=== Males ===
Hot flashes in males could have various causes, including low testosterone. Males with prostate cancer or testicular cancer can also have hot flashes, especially those who are undergoing hormone therapy with antiandrogens, also known as androgen antagonists, which reduce testosterone to castrate levels. Males who are castrated can also get hot flashes.

=== Intersex people ===
Hot flashes can occur in people with various disorders of sex development, especially amongst those whose hormones are in flux, or otherwise experience a deficiency or overabundance in one or more sex hormones, such as estrogen, progesterone, and testosterone. Intersex persons can also experience hot flashes after undergoing a number of surgical interventions in their sex anatomy—such as a postpubertal orchiectomy—when they are not accompanied by post-procedural supplemental hormones to accommodate the loss of a particular hormone-producing organ or gland.

=== Types ===
Some menopausal females may experience both standard hot flashes and a second type sometimes referred to as "slow hot flashes" or "ember flashes". The standard hot flash comes on rapidly, sometimes reaching maximum intensity in as little as a minute. It lasts at full intensity for only a few minutes before gradually fading.

Slow "ember" flashes appear almost as quickly but are less intense and last for around half an hour. Females who experience them may undergo them year round, rather than primarily in the summer, and ember flashes may linger for years after the more intense hot flashes have passed.

== Mechanism ==
Research on hot flashes is mostly focused on treatment options. The exact cause and pathogenesis of vasomotor symptoms (VMS) such as hot flashes has not yet been fully studied.

Hot flashes are associated with declining levels of estrogen, estrogen withdrawal, and other hormonal changes. It does not appear that low levels of estrogen are the sole cause of hot flashes, as women who experience hot flashes have approximately the same plasma estrogen levels as women who do not have them, and prepubertal girls do not have hot flashes despite low estrogen levels.

There are indications that hot flashes may be due to a change in the hypothalamus's control of temperature regulation.

Transgender men also commonly report experiences of hot flashes. This is linked to hormonal changes possible from many aspects of masculinizing hormone therapy, including the use of gonadotropin-releasing hormone agonists as puberty blockers, reduction of estrogen levels after having undergone oopherectomy, and long term testosterone use reducing production of estradiol.

== Treatment ==
=== Hormone replacement therapy ===
Hormone replacement therapy (HRT) may relieve many of the symptoms of menopause. Oral HRT may increase the risk of breast cancer, stroke, and dementia and has other potentially serious short-term and long-term risks. The incidence of cardiovascular disease in women has shown a rise that matches the increase in the number of post menopausal women, and recent studies have examined the benefits and side effects of oral versus transdermal application of different estrogens and found that transdermal applications of estradiol may give the vascular benefits lowering the incidences of cardiovascular events with fewer adverse side effects than oral preparations.

Women who experience troublesome hot flashes may try alternatives to hormonal therapies as the first line of treatment. If a woman chooses hormones, a doctor may prescribe the lowest dose that alleviates her symptoms for as short a time as possible. The Endocrine Society concluded that women taking hormone replacement therapy for five years or more experienced overall benefits in their symptoms including relief of hot flashes and symptoms of urogenital atrophy and prevention of fractures and diabetes.

When estrogen as estradiol is used transdermally as a patch, gel, or pessary with micronized progesterone this may avoid the serious side effects associated with oral estradiol HRT since this avoids first pass metabolism, or phase I drug metabolism. Women taking bioidentical estrogen, orally or transdermally, who have a uterus may still take a progestin or micronized progesterone to lower the risk of endometrial cancer. A French study of 80,391 postmenopausal women followed for several years concluded that estrogen in combination with micronized progesterone is not associated with an increased risk of breast cancer. The plant-derived progesterone creams sold over the counter contain too little progesterone to be effective. Wild yam (Dioscorea villosa) extract creams are not effective since the natural progesterone present in the extract is not bioavailable.

Between 40-50% of Western women use treatment other than hormone therapy.

=== Selective serotonin reuptake inhibitors ===
SSRIs are a class of pharmaceuticals that are most commonly used in the treatment of depression. They have been found efficient in alleviating hot flashes. On 28 June 2013 FDA approved Brisdelle (low-dose paroxetine mesylate) for the treatment of moderate-to-severe vasomotor symptoms (e.g. hot flashes and night sweats) associated with menopause. Paroxetine became the first and only non-hormonal therapy for menopausal hot flashes approved by FDA.

=== Clonidine ===
Clonidine is a blood pressure-lowering medication that can be used to relieve menopausal hot flashes when hormone replacement therapy is not needed or not desired. For hot flashes, clonidine works by helping reduce the response of the blood vessels to stimuli that cause them to narrow and widen. While not all women respond to clonidine as a hot flash medication, it can reduce hot flashes by 40% in some peri-menopausal women.

=== Curcumin ===
The anti-inflammatory properties of curcumin reduce vasomotor symptoms such as hot flashes and night sweats, while also reducing systolic and diastolic blood pressure in postmenopausal women. Curcumin is a yellow/orange polyphenol which is the major constituent of the spice turmeric, and gives turmeric its color. Curcumin has low bioavailability, but coadministration with piperine (the alkaloid which gives pungency to black pepper) can increase absorption up to 2,000 percent.

=== Isoflavones ===
Isoflavones are commonly found in legumes such as soy and red clover. The two soy isoflavones implicated in relieving menopausal symptoms are genistein and daidzein, and are also known as phytoestrogens. The half life of these molecules is about eight hours, which might explain why some studies have not consistently shown effectiveness of soy products for menopausal symptoms. Although red clover (Trifolium pratense) contains isoflavones similar to soy, the effectiveness of this herb for menopausal symptoms at relatively low concentrations points to a different mechanism of action. Genistein alone has been shown to reduce hot flashes. Equol produced by gut bacteria from daidzein has similar structure to human estradiol and can thus alleviate menopausal symptoms. Antibiotics and high fat diet (saturated animal fat, not unsaturated plant fat) reduce production of equol by gut bacteria.

=== Other phytoestrogens ===
Dietary changes that include a higher consumption of phytoestrogens from sources such as soy, red clover, ginseng, and yam may relieve hot flashes.

- Ginseng: Very few studies exist on the effect of ginseng for relief of menopausal symptoms. In a large double-blinded randomized controlled trial, reduction in hot flashes was not statistically significant but showed a strong trend towards improvement. Lack of statistical significance suggests future research, but does not meet the scientific bar for ginseng to be deemed effective.
- Flaxseed: There have also been several clinical trials using flaxseed. Flaxseed is the richest source of lignans, which is one of three major classes of phytoestrogen. Lignans are thought to have estrogen agonist and antagonist effects as well as antioxidant properties. Flaxseed and its lignans may have potent anti-estrogenic effects on estrogen receptor positive breast cancer and may have benefits in breast cancer prevention efforts. One recent study done in France, looked at four types of lignans, including that found in flaxseed (Secoisolariciresinol) in a prospective cohort study to see if intake predicted breast cancer incidence. The authors report lowered risk of breast cancer among over 58,000 postmenopausal women who had the third highest quartile of lignan intake. There have been a few small pilot studies that have tested the effect of flaxseed on hot flashes. Currently there is a large study sponsored by the National Cancer Institute that is ongoing, but not accepting any new participants. The rationale for the study is that estrogen can relieve the symptoms of menopause, but can also cause the growth of breast cancer cells. Flaxseed may reduce the number of hot flashes and improve mood and quality of life in postmenopausal women not receiving estrogen therapy.

=== Acupuncture ===
Acupuncture has been suggested to reduce incidence of hot flashes in women with breast cancer and men with prostate cancer, but the quality of evidence is low.

== Epidemiology ==
Obesity (especially visceral fat), smoking, and high anxiety are major risk factors for hot flashes. It has been speculated that hot flashes are less common among Asian women, possibly because of higher soy consumption. Only about 30% of Western populations can produce equol, compared to about 60% of Asian populations due to differences in gut bacteria that can process isoflavones from soy.

Menopausal women who have more hot flashes have a higher risk of hypertension and cardiovascular disease.

== See also ==
- Flushing
- Hypoglycemia (low blood sugar) can cause similar symptoms
- Hyperthermia
- Fever
- Perimenopause
