= Preprotachykinin =

Preprotachykinins are precursor proteins that are modified into tachykinin peptides. Via alternative splicing and post-translational modifications, preprotachykinins can produce multiple peptide neurotransmitters.

There are two human preprotachykinins:

1. Preprotachykinin-1 (also PPT-1, PPT-I, or PPT-A), which produces substance P and neurokinin A (also called "substance K"), and the derived neuropeptide K and neurokinin gamma.
2. Tachykinin-3 (also preprotachykinin-B or PPT-B), which produces neurokinin B.
