= Elçin =

Elçin is a feminine Turkish given name and a surname. Notable people with the name include:

== People ==
=== Given name ===
- Elçin Sangu (born 1985), Turkish actress
- Elçin Kaya (born 1993), Turkish athlete
- Sena Elçin Karakaş (born 2004), Turkish trampoline gymnast

=== Surname ===
- Cansel Elçin (born 1973), Turkish actor

== See also ==
- Elcin Barker Ergun, business leader in the pharmaceutical industry
- Elchin Alizade, Azerbaijani boxer Elçin Əlizadə
