= Neurogenic inflammation =

Type of inflammation

Neurogenic inflammation is inflammation arising from the local release by afferent neurons of inflammatory mediators such as substance P, calcitonin gene-related peptide (CGRP), neurokinin A (NKA), and endothelin-3 (ET-3). For example, release of neuropeptides can increase vasodilatation and capillary permeability of vascular endothelial and smooth muscle cells.

The release of pro-inflammatory mediators is thought to be triggered by the activation of ion channels that are the principal detectors of noxious environmental stimuli. The heat/capsaicin receptor TRPV1 and the wasabi receptor TRPA1. TRPA1 channels stimulated by lipopolysaccharides may also cause acute neurogenic inflammation.

Once released, these neuropeptides induce the release of histamine from nearby mast cells. In turn, histamine evokes the release of substance P and CGRP; thus, a bidirectional link between histamine and neuropeptides in neurogenic inflammation is established.

Neurogenic inflammation appears to play a role in the pathogenesis of numerous disorders, including migraine, psoriasis, asthma, vasomotor rhinitis, fibromyalgia, eczema, rosacea, dystonia, and multiple chemical sensitivity. In migraine, stimulation of the trigeminal nerve causes neurogenic inflammation via the release of neuropeptides, including substance P, nitric oxide, vasoactive intestinal polypeptide, 5-HT, neurokinin A, and CGRP.

== Prevention ==
Magnesium deficiency causes neurogenic inflammation in a rat model. Researchers have theorized that since substance P which appears at day five of induced magnesium deficiency, is known to stimulate in turn the production of other inflammatory cytokines including Interleukin 1 (IL-1), interleukin 6 (IL-6), and tumor necrosis factor alpha (TNFα), which begin a sharp rise at day 12, substance P is a key in the path from magnesium deficiency to the subsequent cascade of neuro-inflammation. In a later study, researchers provided rats dietary levels of magnesium that were reduced but still within the range of dietary intake found in the human population, and observed an increase in substance P, TNFα, and interleukin-1 beta (IL-1β), followed by exacerbated bone loss. These and other data suggest that deficient dietary magnesium intake, even at levels not uncommon in humans, may trigger neurogenic inflammation and lead to an increased risk of osteoporosis.

== Treatment ==
In 2018, three CGRP blockers were approved by the FDA for the prevention of migraine: erenumab; fremanezumab; and galcanezumab.

The calcitonin gene-related peptide (CGRP) is a therapeutic target in migraine because of its hypothesized role in mediating trigeminovascular pain transmission and the vasodilatory component of neurogenic inflammation. In 2018, the US Food and Drug Administration (FDA) approved the CGRP antagonists erenumab, fremanezumab, and galcanezumab for migraine prevention. Additional CGRP blockers are progressing through clinical trials.

Anticipating later botox therapy for migraine, early work by Jancsó et al. found some success in treatment using denervation or pretreatment with capsaicin to prevent uncomfortable symptoms of neurogenic inflammation.

A 2010 study of the treatment of migraine with CGRP blockers had shown promise for CGRP blockers. In early trials, the first oral nonpeptide CGRP antagonist, MK-0974 (Telcagepant), was shown effective in the treatment of migraine attacks, but elevated liver enzymes in two participants were found. Other therapies and other links in the neurogenic inflammatory pathway for interruption of disease are under study, including migraine therapies.

Noting that botulinum toxin has been shown to have an effect on inhibiting neurogenic inflammation, and evidence suggesting the role of neurogenic inflammation in the pathogenesis of psoriasis, the University of Minnesota has a pilot clinical trial underway to follow up on the observation that patients treated with botulinum toxin for dystonia had dramatic improvement in psoriasis.

Astelin (Azelastine) "is indicated for symptomatic treatment of vasomotor rhinitis including rhinorrhea, nasal congestion, and post nasal drip in adults and children 12 years of age and older."

Statins appear to "decrease expression of the proinflammatory neuropeptides calcitonin gene-related peptide and substance P in sensory neurons," and so might be of use in treating diseases presenting with predominant neurogenic inflammation.

== Research ==
In a 2012 article in Nature Neuroscience Chiu et al. discuss the development of science related to neurogenic inflammation and provide a graphic illustrating key discoveries leading toward the current understanding of neurogenic inflammation, its mechanisms, and the conditions caused by its disorder.
