= Tachykinin peptides =

Tachykinin family
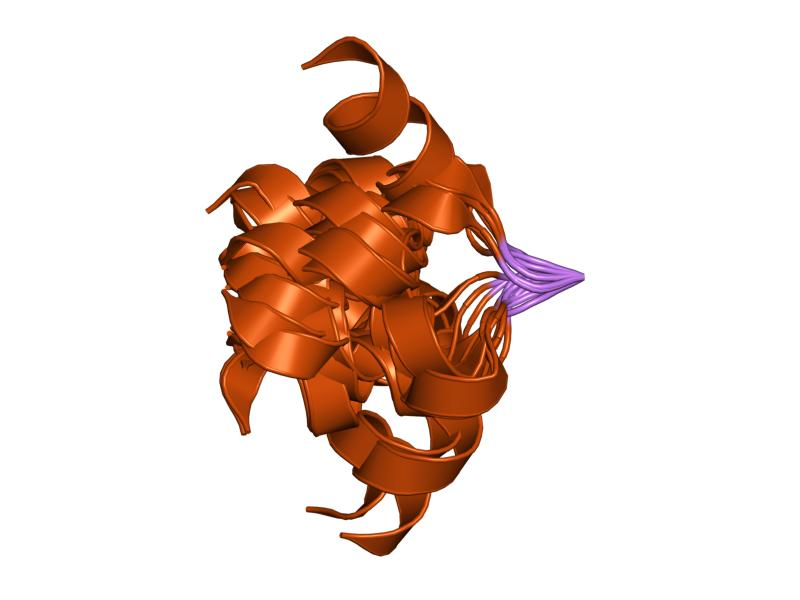
- Structure of the tachykinin peptide Kassinin.

Identifiers
- Symbol: Tachykinin
- Pfam: PF02202
- InterPro: IPR002040
- SMART: TK
- PROSITE: PDOC00240
- SCOP2: 1myu / SCOPe / SUPFAM
- OPM superfamily: 143
- OPM protein: 1myu
Available protein structures:
- PDB: IPR002040 PF02202 (ECOD; PDBsum)
- AlphaFold: IPR002040; PF02202

Tachykinin peptides are one of the largest families of neuropeptides, found from amphibians to mammals. They were so named due to their ability to rapidly induce contraction of gut tissue. The tachykinin family is characterized by a common C-terminal sequence, Phe-X-Gly-Leu-Met-NH2, where X is either an Aromatic or an Aliphatic amino acid. The genes that produce tachykinins encode precursor proteins called preprotachykinins, which are chopped apart into smaller peptides by posttranslational proteolytic processing. The genes also code for multiple splice forms that are made up of different sets of peptides.

Tachykinins excite neurons, evoke behavioral responses, are potent vasodilators, and contract (directly or indirectly) many smooth muscles. Tachykinins are from ten to twelve residues long.

The two human tachykinin genes are called TAC1 and TAC3 for historical reasons, and are equivalent to Tac1 and Tac2 of the mouse, respectively. TAC1 encodes neurokinin A (formerly known as substance K), neuropeptide K (which has also been called neurokinin K), neuropeptide gamma, and Substance P. Alpha, beta, and gamma splice forms are produced; the alpha form lacks exon 6 and the gamma form lacks exon 4. All three splice forms of TAC1 produce substance P, but only the beta and gamma forms produce the other three peptides. Neuropeptide K and neuropeptide gamma are N-terminally longer versions of neurokinin A that appear to be final peptide products in some tissues.

TAC3 encodes neurokinin B.

The best known tachykinin is Substance P.

== Receptors ==
There are three known mammalian tachykinin receptors termed NK_{1}, NK_{2} and NK_{3}. All are members of the 7 transmembrane g protein-coupled family of receptors and induce the activation of phospholipase C, producing inositol triphosphate. NK_{1}, NK_{2} and NK_{3} selectively bind to substance P, neurokinin A, and neurokinin B, respectively. Whilst the receptors are not specific to any individual tachykinin, they do have differing affinity for the tachykinins:

- NK_{1}: SP > NKA > NKB
- NK_{2}: NKA > NKB > SP
- NK_{3}: NKB > NKA > SP

Antagonists of neurokinin-1 (NK_{1}) receptors (NK1 receptor antagonists), through which substance P acts, have been proposed to belong to a new class of antidepressants, while NK_{2} antagonists have been proposed as anxiolytics and NK_{3} antagonists have been proposed as antipsychotics.

Tachykinin peptides are also involved in inflammation, and tachykinin receptor antagonists have been researched for use in treating inflammatory conditions such as asthma and irritable bowel syndrome. The main use for which these antagonist drugs have been applied so far, however, is as antiemetics, in both human and veterinary medicine.

Examples of tachykinin antagonists include:

- Aprepitant
- Casopitant
- Fosaprepitant
- Maropitant
- Nepadutant
- Osanetant
- Saredutant
- Talnetant

== Subfamilies ==
- Tachykinin InterPro: IPR008215
