= SKR =

SKR or SKr may mean:

- Tachykinin receptor 2, a human gene
- Saraiki language, ISO 639-3 code
- SKR Engineering College, a college in Chennai, Tamil Nadu, India
