= Berlin Chemie =

German pharmaceutical company

Berlin-Chemie AG
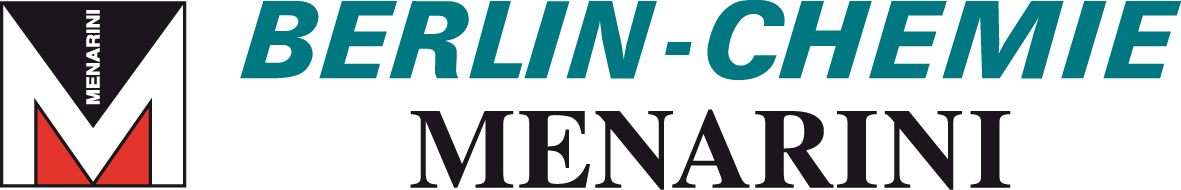
- Company type: Privately held company
- Industry: Pharmaceutical industry
- Founded: 1890
- Headquarters: Berlin, Germany
- Key people: Han Steutel (Chairman of the Board); Edward Szybowski; Stefano Papa; Attilio Sebastio; Christiane von der Eltz; Ivan Bergstein
- Revenue: 1.5 billion EUR (2021)
- Owner: Menarini Group
- Number of employees: 5,000 (2021)
- Website: www.berlin-chemie.com

Berlin-Chemie AG is a German pharmaceutical company based in Berlin, Germany. The company has been a wholly-owned subsidiary of the Italian Menarini Group since 1992.

== History ==
Berlin-Chemie considers the establishment of a plant for the laboratory preparations of the Chemical factory of Kahlbaum in Berlin-Adlershof in 1890, as its origin. The first factory located in the former administrative district of Treptow, Berlin-Adlershof. In 1927 after the merger with Schering AG employees began the development of drugs. After the end of the Second World War, the Adlershof factory of Schering AG was located in the Soviet occupation zone and thus in the later German Democratic Republic. From the mid-50s onwards, the company signed as VEB Berlin-Chemie. When the state-owned companies were privatized or dissolved after the political turnaround, the Italian group Menarini took over the factory in Berlin in 1992, including the product name, and thus immediately found a larger sales market in Eastern Europe.

== Products ==
In February 2013, Berlin-Chemie took over the Priligy brand, a drug against premature ejaculation. Since mid-2013, there has been a media campaign on the internet and through posters on the subject of premature ejaculation, which many physicians are critical of. According to the imprint of the website in question, Later Come.de, this is a media contribution by Berlin-Chemie AG.

Since 2015, Berlin-Chemie has been able to manufacture and sell anti-cancer drugs through a license agreement with the Japanese drug manufacturer Chugai.

The production of infusion solutions was discontinued in 2019.

In 2023, the World Intellectual Property Organization (WIPO)’s Madrid Yearly Review ranked Berlin Chemie's number of marks applications filled under the Madrid System as 6th in the world, with 107 trademarks applications submitted during 2023.
