= Ibodutant =

Chemical compound

Clinical data
- Other names: 6-methyl-N-[1-[[(2R)-1-[[1-(oxan-4-ylmethyl)piperidin-4- yl]methylamino]-1-oxo-3-phenylpropan-2-yl]carbamoyl]cyclopentyl]-1-benzothiophene-2-carboxamide
- Routes of administration: Oral
- ATC code: none

Identifiers
- IUPAC name: Nα-[(1-{[(6-methyl-1-benzothien-2-yl)carbonyl]amino}cyclopentyl)carbonyl]-N-{[1-(tetrahydro-2H-pyran-4-ylmethyl)piperidin-4-yl]methyl}-D-phenylalaninamide
- CAS Number: 522664-63-7
- PubChem CID: 11527495
- IUPHAR/BPS: 2117
- ChemSpider: 9702281
- UNII: 1H7RSQ28BJ
- CompTox Dashboard (EPA): DTXSID20966639

Chemical and physical data
- Formula: C_{37}H_{48}N_{4}O_{4}S
- Molar mass: 644.88 g·mol^{−1}
- 3D model (JSmol): Interactive image
- SMILES: CC1=CC2=C(C=C1)C=C(S2)C(=O)NC3(CCCC3)C(=O)NC(CC4=CC=CC=C4)C(=O)NCC5CCN(CC5)CC6CCOCC6
- InChI: InChI=1S/C37H48N4O4S/c1-26-9-10-30-23-33(46-32(30)21-26)35(43)40-37(15-5-6-16-37)36(44)39-31(22-27-7-3-2-4-8-27)34(42)38-24-28-11-17-41(18-12-28)25-29-13-19-45-20-14-29/h2-4,7-10,21,23,28-29,31H,5-6,11-20,22,24-25H2,1H3,(H,38,42)(H,39,44)(H,40,43)/t31-/m1/s1; Key:YQYSVMKCMIUCHY-WJOKGBTCSA-N

Ibodutant was a candidate drug for irritable bowel syndrome diarrhea, developed by The Menarini Group. As of March 2015, it underwent a multicentre double blind efficacy clinical study. Ibodutant selectively blocks the tachykinin receptor NK_{2}, with blockade practically complete in nanomolar concentrations. A phase 2 trial in Europe (the IRIS-2 trial) completed in May 2012 with positive results. A 52-week phase 3 study was terminated as of 2015 because of low response and negative results of study NAK-06.

== See also ==
- GR-159,897
- Nepadutant
- Saredutant
