= Massimiliana Landini Aleotti =

Italian businesswoman (born 1942)

- Born: 7 August 1942 (age 83); Lerici, Italy
- Occupation: Owner of Menarini
- Spouse: Alberto Aleotti (deceased)
- Children: 2

Massimiliana Landini Aleotti (born 7 August 1942) is an Italian billionaire businesswoman. She is the co-owner and inheritor of the pharmaceutical company Menarini based in Florence, Tuscany, and one of the world's ten richest women.

== Personal life ==
As of March 2026, Forbes estimated her net worth at US$7.9 billion.

Her daughter Lucia is chairman of Menarini and son Alberto Giovanni is vice chairman.
