= GR-159897 =

Chemical compound

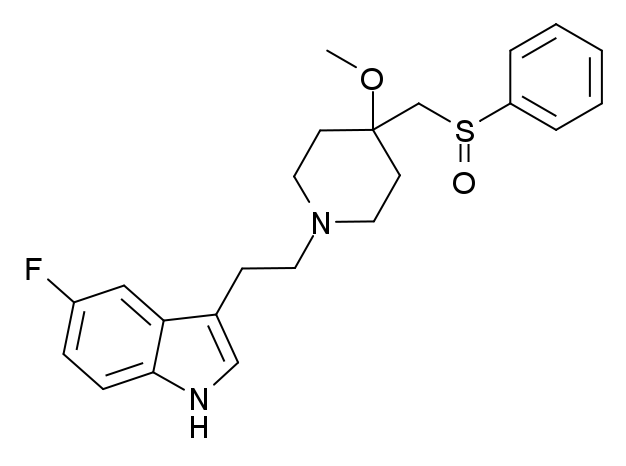

Identifiers
- IUPAC name: 5-fluoro-3-(2-(4-methoxy-4-([(R)-phenylsulphinyl]methyl)-1-piperidinyl)ethyl)-1H-indole
- CAS Number: 158848-32-9
- PubChem CID: 9555764
- ChemSpider: 2807862
- CompTox Dashboard (EPA): DTXSID20393749

Chemical and physical data
- Formula: C_{23}H_{27}FN_{2}O_{2}S
- Molar mass: 414.54 g·mol^{−1}
- 3D model (JSmol): Interactive image
- SMILES: c4ccccc4S(=O)CC2(OC)CCN(CC2)CCc(c1cc3F)c[nH]c1cc3
- InChI: InChI=1S/C23H27FN2O2S/c1-28-23(17-29(27)20-5-3-2-4-6-20)10-13-26(14-11-23)12-9-18-16-25-22-8-7-19(24)15-21(18)22/h2-8,15-16,25H,9-14,17H2,1H3; Key:BANYJBHWTOJQDU-UHFFFAOYSA-N

GR-159897 is a potent and selective NK_{2} receptor antagonist drug. It has anxiolytic effects in animal models, and also inhibits bronchoconstriction of the airways, which may potentially make it useful in the treatment of asthma.

== See also ==
- Ibodutant
- Nepadutant
- Saredutant
