= Nepadutant =

Chemical compound

Clinical data
- Routes of administration: Injection
- ATC code: None

Pharmacokinetic data
- Bioavailability: <3% (oral)
- Elimination half-life: 44 minutes (IV)

Identifiers
- IUPAC name: (2S)-2-[[(3S,6S,9S,12S)-12-[[(2S)-4-[[(2R,3R,4R,5S,6R)-3-acetamido-4,5-dihydroxy-6-(hydroxymethyl)oxan-2-yl]amino]-2-amino-4-oxobutanoyl]amino]-6-benzyl-9-(1H-indol-3-ylmethyl)-5,8,11,14-tetraoxo-1,4,7,10-tetrazacyclotetradecane-3-carbonyl]amino]-4-methylpentanoic acid
- CAS Number: 183747-35-5
- PubChem CID: 3086682
- IUPHAR/BPS: 2123
- ChemSpider: 2343247
- UNII: XW59TYL1XH

Chemical and physical data
- Formula: C_{45}H_{60}N_{10}O_{14}
- Molar mass: 965.031 g·mol^{−1}
- 3D model (JSmol): Interactive image
- SMILES: CC(C)C[C@@H](C(=O)O)NC(=O)[C@@H]1CNC(=O)C[C@@H](C(=O)N[C@H](C(=O)N[C@H](C(=O)N1)Cc2ccccc2)Cc3c[nH]c4c3cccc4)NC(=O)[C@H](CC(=O)N[C@H]5[C@@H]([C@H]([C@@H]([C@H](O5)CO)O)O)NC(=O)C)N
- InChI: InChI=1S/C45H60N10O14/c1-21(2)13-31(45(67)68)53-43(66)32-19-48-34(58)17-30(50-39(62)26(46)16-35(59)55-44-36(49-22(3)57)38(61)37(60)33(20-56)69-44)42(65)52-29(15-24-18-47-27-12-8-7-11-25(24)27)41(64)51-28(40(63)54-32)14-23-9-5-4-6-10-23/h4-12,18,21,26,28-33,36-38,44,47,56,60-61H,13-17,19-20,46H2,1-3H3,(H,48,58)(H,49,57)(H,50,62)(H,51,64)(H,52,65)(H,53,66)(H,54,63)(H,55,59)(H,67,68)/t26-,28-,29-,30-,31-,32-,33+,36+,37+,38+,44+/m0/s1; Key:NPSVXOVMLVOMDD-SXRVEDALSA-N

Nepadutant (INN; development code MEN-11420) is a glycosylated bicyclic cyclohexapeptide drug which acts as a highly selective NK_{2} receptor antagonist. It was developed by the Menarini Group and investigated for the treatment of functional gastrointestinal disorders and asthma but was never marketed.

== See also ==
- GR-159,897
- Ibodutant
- Saredutant
