= Neurokinin A =

TAC1 tachykinin, precursor 1
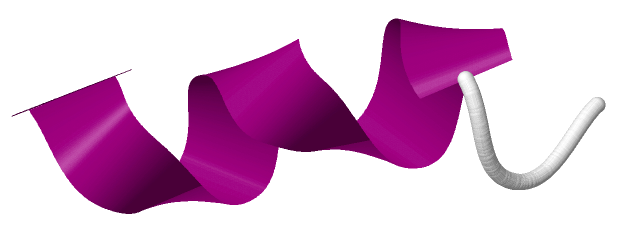
- Solution structure of the tachykinin peptide Neurokinin A in the presence of micelles.

Identifiers
- Symbol: TAC1
- Alt. symbols: TAC2, NKNA
- NCBI gene: 6863
- HGNC: 11517
- OMIM: 162320
- RefSeq: NM_013998
- UniProt: P20366

Other data
- Locus: Chr. 7 q21-q22
Search for
- Structures: Swiss-model
- Domains: InterPro

Neurokinin A

Identifiers
CAS Number	86933-74-6
3D model (JSmol)	Interactive image
ChemSpider	4470818
IUPHAR/BPS	2089
MeSH	Neurokinin+A
PubChem CID	55582
UNII	94168F9W1D
- InChI: InChI=1S/C50H80N14O14S/c1-26(2)18-34(45(73)58-32(42(53)70)15-17-79-6)57-38(67)23-55-49(77)40(27(3)4)63-47(75)35(19-29-12-8-7-9-13-29)60-48(76)37(24-65)62-46(74)36(21-39(68)69)61-50(78)41(28(5)66)64-44(72)33(14-10-11-16-51)59-43(71)31(52)20-30-22-54-25-56-30/h7-9,12-13,22,25-28,31-37,40-41,65-66H,10-11,14-21,23-24,51-52H2,1-6H3,(H2,53,70)(H,54,56)(H,55,77)(H,57,67)(H,58,73)(H,59,71)(H,60,76)(H,61,78)(H,62,74)(H,63,75)(H,64,72)(H,68,69)/t28-,31+,32+,33+,34+,35+,36+,37+,40+,41+/m1/s1 Key: HEAUFJZALFKPBA-JPQUDPSNSA-N; InChI=1/C50H80N14O14S/c1-26(2)18-34(45(73)58-32(42(53)70)15-17-79-6)57-38(67)23-55-49(77)40(27(3)4)63-47(75)35(19-29-12-8-7-9-13-29)60-48(76)37(24-65)62-46(74)36(21-39(68)69)61-50(78)41(28(5)66)64-44(72)33(14-10-11-16-51)59-43(71)31(52)20-30-22-54-25-56-30/h7-9,12-13,22,25-28,31-37,40-41,65-66H,10-11,14-21,23-24,51-52H2,1-6H3,(H2,53,70)(H,54,56)(H,55,77)(H,57,67)(H,58,73)(H,59,71)(H,60,76)(H,61,78)(H,62,74)(H,63,75)(H,64,72)(H,68,69)/t28-,31+,32+,33+,34+,35+,36+,37+,40+,41+/m1/s1 Key: HEAUFJZALFKPBA-JPQUDPSNBV
- SMILES: C[C@H]([C@@H](C(=O)N[C@@H](CC(=O)O)C(=O)N[C@@H](CO)C(=O)N[C@@H](Cc1ccccc1)C(=O)N[C@@H](C(C)C)C(=O)NCC(=O)N[C@@H](CC(C)C)C(=O)N[C@@H](CCSC)C(=O)N)NC(=O)[C@H](CCCCN)NC(=O)[C@H](Cc2cnc[nH]2)N)O

Properties
Chemical formula	C_{50}H_{80}N_{14}O_{14}S
Molar mass	1133.32
- Except where otherwise noted, data are given for materials in their standard state (at 25 °C [77 °F], 100 kPa). verify (what is ?) Infobox references

Neurokinin A (NKA), formerly known as Substance K, is a neurologically active peptide translated from the pre-protachykinin gene. Neurokinin A has many excitatory effects on mammalian nervous systems and is also influential on the mammalian inflammatory and pain responses.

Neurokinin A (formerly known as substance K) is a member of the tachykinin family of neuropeptide neurotransmitters. Tachykinins are important contributors to nociceptive processing, satiety, and smooth muscle contraction. Tachykinins are known to be highly excitatory neurotransmitters in major central neural systems. Neurokinin A is ubiquitous in both the central and peripheral mammalian nervous systems, and seems to be involved in reactions to pain and the inflammatory responses. It is produced from the same preprotachykinin A gene as the neuropeptide substance P. Both substance P and neurokinin A are encoded by the same mRNA, which when alternatively spliced can be translated into either compound. It has various roles in the body of humans and other animals, specifically stimulation of extravascular smooth muscle, vasodilation, hypertensive action, immune system activation, and pain management. The deduced amino acid sequence of neurokinin A is as follows:

- His Lys Thr Asp Ser Phe Val Gly Leu Met (HKTDSFVGLM)

with amidation at the C-terminus.

== Gene ==
The pre-protachykinin-1 and pre-protachykinin-2 genes in mice encode four very distinct peptides with varying physiological function. Alternative splicing of the pre-protachykinin-1 gene gives rise to four different peptide precursors (alphatac1, betatac1, deltatac1 und gammatac1), which are further processed into several related peptides including neurokinin A and substance P. The alpha tac1 and beta tac1 precursors encode synthesis of both Substance P and neurokinin A.

== Structure ==
Tachykinins are a structurally related group of neuropeptides sharing the C-terminal sequence Phe-X-Gly-Leu-Met-NH2. The amino acid sequence of substance P and neurokinin A are well conserved across mammals species. Structure of mammalian neurokinin A was obtained using CD spectropolarimetry and 2D proton NMR. Analysis showed that in water, the peptide adopts an extended conformation while in the presence of micelles (a model cell membrane system), an alpha helical conformation is induced in the central core (Asp4-Met10).

== Function ==

Like Substance P [SP], Neurokinin A is present in excitatory neurons and secretory cells of the hypothalamic–pituitary–adrenal axis. Additionally both SP and neurokinin A are found in the neurosensory system and modulates a wide range of inflammatory and tissue repairing processes. In various tissues, such as the skin, the release of bioactive tachykinins by sensory nerve fibers C, that extend from the dorsal root ganglia into the epidermis, directly influence the activity of keratinocytes. Inflammation, tissue healing and cell proliferation have been linked to both SP and neurokinin A release into surrounding tissues.

=== Nervous system ===
The overstimulation of the hypothalamic–pituitary–adrenal axis system and elevated secretion of corticotropin-releasing hormone from the hypothalamus, have been studied in many clinical manifestations of pathological depression. Studies have shown that stress-induced activation of the noradrenergic prefrontal lobe system may be under the control of both endogenously released corticotropin-releasing hormone and SP and neurokinin A. This study directly links the secretion of neurokinin A and SP to certain forms of depression characterized by the corticoid receptor hypothesis of depression.

Inflammatory responses within the central nervous system (CNS) are often the result of traumatic injury or exposure to infectious agents. Inflammation provides a protective immune response to such stresses may also result in progressive damage to the CNS. There is significant evidence to indicate that tachykinins are a major component of the neural inflammatory response at peripheral tissues as well as the CNS. The ability to regulate tachykinin secretion represents an important mechanism for designing potentially useful drugs to treat inflammation. Neurokinin A has been associated with the chemokines interleukin-1 and interleukin-6, both of which are heavily involved in the inflammatory process during infections.

Neuronal tissue can be severely damaged either through physical trauma or intracellular stresses, either chronic or acute. Either of these scenarios can result in calcium overload, protein degradation, the unfolded protein response or an accumulation of DNA damage. Endogenous cellular responses are activated within nerve tissue in response to damage in order to protect cellular, protein, and nucleic acid integrity. A large variety of neuroprotective signaling mechanisms exist, which can be manipulated by drugs to reduce damage from cellular damage in neurons. Tachykinins thus have a number of neuroprotective physiological roles in medical conditions

=== Immune system ===
The immune system is a highly integrated system which receives input from many sources, such as sites of injury, nociceptors and white blood cells. Chemical signals therefore are an important component of paracrine, autocrine and endocrine signaling. Neurokinin A was shown to be a potent chemo attractor for T-cells increasing the migration into infected tissues. This migration is necessary for the pathogen seeking activity of T-cells. Some chemokines trigger the intravascular adhesion of T-cells whereas others direct the migration of leukocytes into and within the extravascular space. Since lymphocytes must be positioned correctly to interact with other cells, the pattern of chemokine receptors and the type and distribution of chemokines in tissues critically influence immune responses. The molecular mechanism behind neurokinin's role as a chemoattractor is currently unclear.

Neurokinin A has an inhibitory effect on the formation of myeloid cells, and appear to be involved in one specific receptor since the effect can be completely abolished by a NK-2 receptor-selective antagonist. The inhibitory effect of neuronkinin A is countered by the excitatory effect of a structurally similar compound: substance P. The opposite effects on myelogenesis by substance P and neurokinin A may represent an important feedback mechanism for maintenance of homeostasis.

=== Respiratory system ===
The binding of neurokinin A to the NKR-2 results in bronchoconstriction, mucus production in the lungs and process neurogenic inflammation. This release is propagated through the stimulation of e-NANC nerves in the bronchial epithelium via an axon-reflex mechanism.

=== Cardiovascular system ===
Neurokinin has been shown to contribute to both bradycardia and myocardial infarctions through the activation of NK2 receptors. The dual sensory-motor function of neurokinin A containing afferent neurons is a component of the intracardiac nervous system. Varicose processes of tachykinin-containing nerves are abundant in coronary arteries and in the cardiac ganglia. The diverse responses that are triggered by locally released tachykinins produce beneficial effects such as modulation of ganglion transmission. However, it is also possible that excessive stimulation of cardiac afferents and release of tachykinins, during pathological conditions such as myocardial infarction, could contribute to certain human pathologies.

== Receptor ==
Mechanism of neurokinin induced neurogenic inflammation. Neuropeptides are released from C-fibers due to nervous tissue stress and induce many cellular pathways

Tachykinins selectively bind and activate the G-protein coupled receptors TACR1(NK1R), TACR2(NK2R), and TACR3(NK3R). Neurokinin A binds to the G-protein coupled receptor ultimately increasing the release of inositol-phosphate and calcium second messengers. Each receptor demonstrates a specific affinity for either neurokinin A or substance P peptides. Both peptides, however, can act as full agonists on either receptor, although their potency is decreased when not bound to their specific receptor.

=== NK-2 receptor ===
NK-2 receptors are expressed predominantly in the CNS. Networks involved in emotional processing, such as the prefrontal cortex, cingulate cortex, and amygdala, show the highest concentration of NK-2 receptors. NK-2 receptor antagonists have been theorized to have antidepressant benefits and are presently in clinical trials. As a consequence of its ability to stimulate intestinal smooth muscle, NKA is considered to be specifically active in regulating intestinal motility by its action on NK2 receptors.

==== Antagonists ====
MEN 11420 has been demonstrated to be a potent, selective and competitive antagonist of tachykinin NK2 receptors, both in animal and human models. In vivo animal models, MEN 11420 produces an effective and long-lasting blockade of the NK2 receptors expressed in the smooth muscle of the intestinal, genito-urinary and respiratory tract.

== Clinical significance ==
=== Cancer ===
Circulating concentrations of neurokinin A is an independent indicator of poor prognosis in certain cancers such as carcinoids. Patients presenting with neurokinin A plasma concentrations of >50 pmol/L showed a poorer 3 year survival rate than patients presenting with neurokinin A concentrations of less than 50 pmol/L. These types of studies show that measuring tachykinin levels in human patients may have clinical relevance.

Patients with Midgut Carcinoid disease (MGC) commonly receive neurokinin A test to determine the progression of their disease. Midgut Carcinoid disease is an uncommon disease with occurrence rates of approximately 1.4 per 100,000 of the population per year. MGC has an unpredictable disease progression depending on the patient, symptoms and progression range from rapid and aggressive to chronic. Treatment is difficult because of the varying degrees of severity, so assessing the extent of the disease is extremely important in effective treatment.

=== Asthma ===
The blocking of neuropeptide signaling has come become a novel therapeutic target for suppression of bronchial constriction in asthma patients.

Bronchoconstriction is among the most prominent and extensively studied effects caused by tachykinins. Tachykinins have numerous effects in the respiratory systems especially in asthma patients who are more responsive to tachykinin administration. Through studies with human airways researchers have examined the role tachykinins play in bronchoconstriction, most notably through the receptor NK2, though regulation of NK2 receptors seems to be mediated by the activity of NK1 receptors eluting to complicated inhibition mechanism. Administration of DNK333 (a dual tachykinin receptor NK1/NK2 antagonist) have shown protective activity against neurokinin A induced bronchoconstriction.

=== Neuropsychiatric disorders ===
Neurokinin A is involved in many stress induced neurological disorders, such as depression, schizophrenia and epilepsy.

==== Affective disorders ====
Affective disorders are characterized by a frequent, fluctuating alteration in mood, affecting the patient's thoughts, emotions, and behaviors. Affective disorders include depression, anxiety, and bipolar disorder. A number of approaches have been utilized to study the role that neurokinin A plays in the manifestation and continuation of human affective disorders. The measurement of serum peptide levels in depressed patients as well as anxious patients displayed higher plasma levels of tachykinins than their low-anxiety counterparts. In addition to studies of plasma levels of TKs, cerebrospinal fluid (CSF) levels of neurokinin A have also been directly correlated with depression. Under states of depression, neurokinin immunoreactivity is increased in the frontal cortex, and decreased in the striatum. These peptide levels were not found to be normalized by lithium treatment in mice. Elevated levels of tachykinins in CSF have been found in patients with fibromyalgia syndrome, a disorder that is strongly correlated with depression in human patients. Tachykinin ligands have been extensively studied and determined to be functionally linked to the control of affective phenotypes in a complex physiological manner.

==== Epilepsy ====
Epilepsy is a broad category of disorders with varying types of severity and presented symptoms. Neurokinins have been experimentally determined as possible predictor in the generation of certain forms of epilepsy. Experimentally when substance P is injected into the rat hippocampus, it significantly lowers the initiation threshold for seizures induced in a dose-dependent manner. Experimental data thus has indicated a pro-convulsant role for the Pre-protachykinin-1 gene and thus substance P and neurokinin A.

== Mouse models ==
pre-protachykinin-1 -/- mice show normal fertility and behavioral patterns (litter-mate socialization and pup rearing), but have a reduced sense of anxiety when threatened, compared to both wild-type mice and other mouse models of depression.

== History ==
Neurokinin A was isolated from porcine spinal cord in 1931 by von Euler and Gaddum.
