= Substance P =

Chemical compound (polypeptide neurotransmitter)

Protachykinin-1
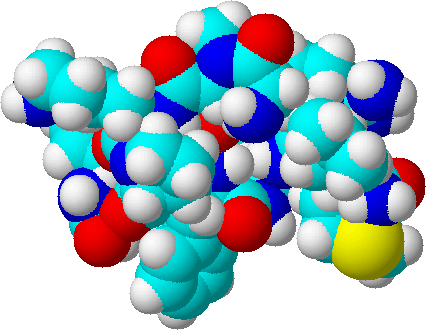
- Spacefilling model of Substance P

Identifiers
- Symbol: TAC1
- Alt. symbols: TAC2, NKNA
- NCBI gene: 6863
- HGNC: 11517
- OMIM: 162320
- RefSeq: NM_003182
- UniProt: P20366

Other data
- Locus: Chr. 7 q21-q22
Search for
- Structures: Swiss-model
- Domains: InterPro

Substance P

Identifiers
CAS Number	33507-63-0
ChEBI	CHEBI:80308
ChEMBL	ChEMBL235363
ChemSpider	33558
ECHA InfoCard	100.046.845
IUPHAR/BPS	2098
MeSH	Substance+P
PubChem CID	36511
UNII	675VGV5J1D
- InChI: InChI= 1S/C63H98N18O13S/c1-37(2)33-45(57(89)74-41(53(68)85)27-32-95-3)73-52(84)36-72-54(86)46(34-38-15-6-4-7-16-38)78-58(90)47(35-39-17-8-5-9-18-39)79-56(88)42(23-25-50(66)82)75-55(87)43(24-26-51(67)83)76-59(91)49-22-14-31-81(49)62(94)44(20-10-11-28-64)77-60(92)48-21-13-30-80(48)61(93)40(65)19-12-29-71-63(69)70/h4-9,15-18,37,40-49H,10-14,19-36,64-65H2,1-3H3,(H2,66,82)(H2,67,83)(H2,68,85)(H,72,86)(H,73,84)(H,74,89)(H,75,87)(H,76,91)(H,77,92)(H,78,90)(H,79,88)(H4,69,70,71)/t40-,41-,42-,43-,44-,45-,46-,47-,48-,49-/m0/s1 Key: ADNPLDHMAVUMIW-CUZNLEPHSA-N; InChI= 1/C63H98N18O13S/c1-37(2)33-45(57(89)74-41(53(68)85)27-32-95-3)73-52(84)36-72-54(86)46(34-38-15-6-4-7-16-38)78-58(90)47(35-39-17-8-5-9-18-39)79-56(88)42(23-25-50(66)82)75-55(87)43(24-26-51(67)83)76-59(91)49-22-14-31-81(49)62(94)44(20-10-11-28-64)77-60(92)48-21-13-30-80(48)61(914,19-36,64-65H2,1-3H3,(H2,66,82)(H2,67,83)(H2,68,85)(H,72,86)(H,73,84)(H,74,89)(H,75,87)(H,76,91)(H,77,92)(H,78,90)(H,79,88)(H4,69,70,71)/t40-,41-,42-,43-,44-,45-,46-,47-,48-,49-/m0/s1 Key: ADNPLDHMAVUMIW-CUZNLEPHBU

Properties
Chemical formula	C_{63}H_{98}N_{18}O_{13}S
Molar mass	1347.63 g/mol
- Except where otherwise noted, data are given for materials in their standard state (at 25 °C [77 °F], 100 kPa). verify (what is ?) Infobox references

Substance P (SP) is a neuropeptide, belonging to the tachykinin family of neuropeptides that acts as a neurotransmitter and a neuromodulator. Substance P and the closely related neurokinin A (NKA) are produced from a polyprotein precursor after alternative splicing of the preprotachykinin A gene. It is an undecapeptide (a peptide composed of a chain of 11 amino acid residues) and has the following sequence:

- Arg Pro Lys Pro Gln Gln Phe Phe Gly Leu Met (RPKPQQFFGLM)

with an amide group at the C-terminus. Substance P is released from the terminals of specific sensory nerves. It is found in the brain and spinal cord and is associated with inflammatory processes and pain.

== Discovery ==
The original discovery of Substance P (SP) was in 1931 by Ulf von Euler and John H. Gaddum as a tissue extract that caused intestinal contraction in vitro. Its tissue distribution and biologic actions were further investigated over the following decades. The eleven-amino-acid structure of the peptide was determined by Chang, et al. in 1971.

In 1983, Neurokinin A (previously known as substance K or neuromedin L) was isolated from porcine spinal cord and was also found to stimulate intestinal contraction.

== Receptor ==
The endogenous receptor for Substance P is neurokinin 1 receptor (NK1-receptor, NK1R). It belongs to the tachykinin receptor sub-family of GPCRs. Other neurokinin subtypes and neurokinin receptors that interact with SP have been reported as well. Amino acid residues that are responsible for the binding of SP and its antagonists are present in the extracellular loops and transmembrane regions of NK-1. Binding of SP to NK-1R results in internalization by the clathrin-dependent mechanism to the acidified endosomes where the complex disassociates. Subsequently, SP is degraded and NK-1R is re-expressed on the cell surface.

Substance P and the NK1-receptor are widely distributed in the brain and are found in brain regions that are specific to regulating emotion (hypothalamus, amygdala, and the periaqueductal gray). They are found in close association with serotonin (5-HT) and neurons containing norepinephrine that are targeted by the currently used antidepressant drugs. The SP receptor promoter contains regions that are sensitive to cAMP, AP-1, AP-4, CEBPB, and epidermal growth factor. Because these regions are related to complexed signal transduction pathways mediated by cytokines, it has been proposed that cytokines and neurotropic factors can induce NK-1. Also, SP can induce the cytokines that are capable of inducing NK-1 transcription factors.

== Function ==
=== Overview ===
Substance P ("P" standing for "Preparation" or "Powder") is a neuropeptide – but only nominally so, as it is ubiquitous. Its receptor – the neurokinin type 1 – is distributed over cytoplasmic membranes of many cell types (neurons, glia, endothelia of capillaries and lymphatics, fibroblasts, stem cells, white blood cells) in many tissues and organs. SP amplifies or excites most cellular processes.

Substance P is a key first responder to most noxious/extreme stimuli (stressors), i.e., those with a potential to compromise an organism's biological integrity. SP is thus regarded as an immediate defense, stress, repair, survival system. The molecule, which is rapidly inactivated (or at times further activated by peptidases) is rapidly released – repetitively and chronically, as warranted, in the presence of a stressor. Unique among biological processes, SP release (and expression of its NK1 Receptor (through autocrine, paracrine, and endocrine-like processes)) may not naturally subside in diseases marked by chronic inflammation (including cancer).

=== Vasodilation ===
Substance P is a potent vasodilator. Substance P–induced vasodilation is dependent on nitric oxide release. Substance P is involved in the axon reflex-mediated vasodilation to local heating and wheal and flare reaction. It has been shown that vasodilation to Substance P is dependent on the NK1 receptor located on the endothelium. In contrast to other neuropeptides studied in human skin, Substance P–induced vasodilation has been found to decline during continuous infusion. This possibly suggests an internalization of neurokinin-1 (NK1). As is typical with many vasodilators, it also has bronchoconstrictive properties, administered through the non-adrenergic, non-cholinergic nervous system (branch of the vagal system).

=== Inflammation ===
SP initiates expression of almost all known immunological chemical messengers (cytokines). Also, most of the cytokines, in turn, induce SP and the NK1 receptor. SP is particularly excitatory to cell growth and multiplication, via usual, as well as oncogenic drivers. SP is a trigger for nausea and emesis. Substance P and other sensory neuropeptides can be released from the peripheral terminals of sensory nerve fibers in the skin, muscle, and joints. It is proposed that this release is involved in neurogenic inflammation, which is a local inflammatory response to certain types of infection or injury.

=== Pain ===
Preclinical data support the notion that Substance P is an important element in pain perception. The sensory function of Substance P is thought to be related to the transmission of pain information into the central nervous system. Substance P coexists with the excitatory neurotransmitter glutamate in primary afferents that respond to painful stimulation. Substance P and other sensory neuropeptides can be released from the peripheral terminals of sensory nerve fibers in the skin, muscle, and joints. It is proposed that this release is involved in neurogenic inflammation, which is a local inflammatory response to certain types of infection or injury. Unfortunately, the reasons why NK1 receptor antagonists have failed as efficacious analgesics in well-conducted clinical proof of concept studies have not yet been persuasively elucidated.

=== Mood, anxiety, learning ===
Substance P has been associated with the regulation of mood disorders, anxiety, stress, reinforcement, neurogenesis, synaptic growth and dendritic arborisation, respiratory rhythm, neurotoxicity, pain, and nociception. In 2014, it was found that Substance P played a role in male fruit fly aggression. Recently, it has been shown that Substance P may play a critical role in long-term potentiation of aversive stimuli.

=== Vomiting ===
The vomiting center in the medulla, called the area postrema, contains low concentrations of Substance P and its receptor, in addition to other neurotransmitters such as choline, histamine, dopamine, serotonin, and endogenous opioids. Their activation stimulates the vomiting reflex. Different emetic pathways exist, and Substance P/NK1R appears to be within the final common pathway to regulate vomiting.

=== Cell growth, proliferation, angiogenesis, and migration ===
The above processes are part and parcel to tissue integrity and repair. Substance P has been known to stimulate cell growth in normal and cancer cell line cultures, and it was shown that Substance P could promote wound healing of non-healing ulcers in humans. SP and its induced cytokines promote multiplication of cells required for repair or replacement, growth of new blood vessels, and "leg-like pods" on cells (including cancer cells) bestowing upon them mobility, and metastasis. It has been suggested that cancer exploits the SP-NK1R to progress and metastasize, and that NK1RAs may be useful in the treatment of several cancer types.

== Clinical significance ==
=== Quantification in disease ===
Elevation of serum, plasma, or tissue SP and/or its receptor (NK1R) has been associated with many diseases: sickle cell crisis; inflammatory bowel disease; major depression and related disorders; fibromyalgia; rheumatological; and infections such as HIV/AIDS and respiratory syncytial virus, as well as in cancer. When assayed in the human, the observed variability of the SP concentrations are large, and in some cases the assay methodology is questionable. SP concentrations cannot yet be used to diagnose disease clinically or gauge disease severity. It is not yet known whether changes in concentration of SP or density of its receptors is the cause of any given disease, or an effect.

=== Blockade for diseases with a chronic immunological component ===
As increasingly documented, the SP-NK1R system induces or modulates many aspects of the immune response, including WBC production and activation, and cytokine expression, Reciprocally, cytokines may induce expression of SP and its NK1R. In this sense, for diseases in which a pro-inflammatory component has been identified or strongly suspected, and for which current treatments are absent or in need of improvement, abrogation of the SP-NK1 system continues to receive focus as a treatment strategy. Currently, the only completely developed method available in that regard is antagonism (blockade, inhibition) of the SP preferring receptor, i.e., by drugs known as neurokinin type 1 antagonists (also termed: SP antagonists, or tachykinin antagonists.) One such drug is aprepitant to prevent the nausea and vomiting that accompanies chemotherapy, typically for cancer. With the exception of chemotherapy-induced nausea and vomiting, the patho-physiological basis of many of the disease groups listed below, for which NK1RAs have been studied as a therapeutic intervention, are to varying extents hypothesized to be initiated or advanced by a chronic non-homeostatic inflammatory response.

==== Dermatological disorders: eczema/psoriasis, chronic pruritus ====
High levels of BDNF and Substance P have been found associated with increased itching in eczema.

==== Infections: HIV-AIDS, measles, RSV, others ====
The role of SP in HIV-AIDS has been well-documented. Doses of aprepitant greater than those tested to date are required for demonstration of full efficacy. Respiratory syncytial and related viruses appear to upregulate SP receptors, and rat studies suggest that NK1RAs may be useful in treating or limiting long term sequelae from such infections.

Entamoeba histolytica is a unicellular parasitic protozoan that infects the lower gastrointestinal tract of humans. The symptoms of infection are diarrhea, constipation, and abdominal pain. This protozoan was found to secrete serotonin as well as Substance P and neurotensin.

==== Inflammatory bowel disease (ibd)/cystitis ====
Despite strong preclinical rationale, efforts to demonstrate efficacy of SP antagonists in inflammatory disease have been unproductive. A study in women with IBS confirmed that an NK1RAs antagonist was anxiolytic.

=== Chemotherapy induced nausea and vomiting ===
In line with its role as a first line defense system, SP is released when toxicants or poisons come into contact with a range of receptors on cellular elements in the chemoreceptor trigger zone, located in the floor of the fourth ventricle of the brain (area postrema). Presumably, SP is released in or around the nucleus of the solitary tract upon integrated activity of dopamine, serotonin, opioid, and/or acetylcholine receptor signaling. NK1Rs are stimulated. In turn, a fairly complex reflex is triggered involving cranial nerves responsible for respiration, retroperistalsis, and general autonomic discharge. The actions of aprepitant are said to be entirely central, thus requiring passage of the drug into the central nervous system. However, given that NK1Rs are unprotected by a blood brain barrier in the area postrema just adjacent to neuronal structures in the medulla, and the activity of sendide (the peptide based NK1RA) against cisplatin-induced emesis in the ferret, it is likely that some peripheral exposure contributes to antiemetic effects, even if through vagal terminals in the clinical setting.

=== Other findings ===
==== Denervation supersensitivity ====
When the innervation to Substance P nerve terminals is lost, post-synaptic cells compensate for the loss of adequate neurotransmitter by increasing the expression of post-synaptic receptors. This, ultimately, leads to a condition known as denervation supersensitivity as the post-synaptic nerves will become hypersensitive to any release of Substance P into the synaptic cleft.

==== Aggression ====
Tachykinin / Substance P plays an evolutionarily conserved role in inducing aggressive behaviors. In rodents and cats, activation of hypothalamic neurons which release Substance P induces aggressive behaviors (defensive biting and predatory attack). Similarly, in fruit flies, tachykinin-releasing neurons have been implicated in aggressive behaviors (lunging). In this context, male-specific tachykinin neurons control lunging behaviors that can be modulated by the amount of tachykinin release.
