= TAC3 =

Protein-coding gene in humans

Identifiers
- Aliases: TAC3, HH10, NKB, NKNB, PRO1155, ZNEUROK1, tachykinin 3, tachykinin precursor 3, NK3, LncZBTB39, preprotachykinin-B
- External IDs: OMIM: 162330; MGI: 98476; GeneCards: TAC3
Available structures
PDB	Ortholog search: PDBe RCSB
PDB	List of PDB id codes 1P9F

Gene location (Human)
Chr.	Chromosome 12 (human)
Band	12q13.3	Start	57,010,000 bp
Band	12q13.3	End	57,028,883 bp

Gene location (Mouse)
Chr.	Chromosome 10 (mouse)
Band	10|10 D3	Start	127,560,347 bp
Band	10|10 D3	End	127,567,637 bp
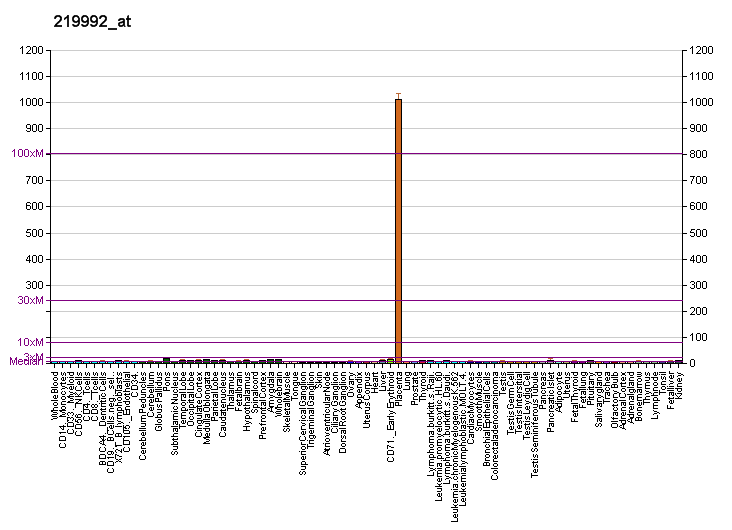
RNA expression pattern
Bgee	Human / Mouse (ortholog); Top expressed in: decidua; gonad; anterior cingulate cortex; caudate nucleus; prefrontal cortex; nucleus accumbens; dorsolateral prefrontal cortex; right frontal lobe; putamen; testicle / Top expressed in: gastrula; habenula; lumbar subsegment of spinal cord; lateral hypothalamus; zygote; neural layer of retina; arcuate nucleus; nucleus of stria terminalis; secondary oocyte; embryo; More reference expression data
BioGPS	More reference expression data
Gene ontology
Molecular function	signaling receptor binding; protein binding; neuromedin K receptor binding; substance K receptor binding
Cellular component	extracellular region; extracellular space
Biological process	female pregnancy; neuropeptide signaling pathway; tachykinin receptor signaling pathway; positive regulation of flagellated sperm motility; G protein-coupled receptor signaling pathway
Sources:Amigo / QuickGO
Orthologs
Databases	NCBI: entry; OMA: entry
Species	Human	Mouse
Entrez	6866	21334
Ensembl	ENSG00000166863	ENSMUSG00000025400
UniProt	Q9UHF0	P55099
RefSeq (mRNA)	NM_001006667; NM_001178054; NM_013251	NM_001199971; NM_009312
RefSeq (protein)	NP_001171525; NP_037383	NP_001186900; NP_033338
Location (UCSC)	Chr 12: 57.01 – 57.03 Mb	Chr 10: 127.56 – 127.57 Mb
PubMed search
- Wikidata
View/Edit Human	View/Edit Mouse

Tachykinin-3, also called tachykinin precursor 3, is a protein that in humans is encoded by the TAC3 gene. This is a precursor protein that is cleaved by enzymes to produce the active hormone neurokinin B. In particular, neurokinin B corresponds to a subchain of positions 81-90 out of the 121 amino acids of the full precursor molecule.

== Naming issues ==
In certain non-human animals, like mice, this gene has been inconsistently designated as either Tac2 or Tac3 by different naming authorities. In humans on the other hand, TAC2 has previously been used to mean TAC1.

== See also ==
- TAC1
- Tachykinin peptides
- Tachykinin receptors
