= Saredutant =

Chemical compound

Clinical data
- ATC code: none

Identifiers
- IUPAC name: N-[(2S)-4-(4-acetamido-4-phenylpiperidin-1-yl)- 2-(3,4-dichlorophenyl)butyl]-N-methylbenzamide
- CAS Number: 142001-63-6
- PubChem CID: 104974
- IUPHAR/BPS: 2111
- ChemSpider: 94726
- UNII: 720U2QK8I5
- ChEMBL: ChEMBL308148
- CompTox Dashboard (EPA): DTXSID00161923
- ECHA InfoCard: 100.111.408

Chemical and physical data
- Formula: C_{31}H_{35}Cl_{2}N_{3}O_{2}
- Molar mass: 552.54 g·mol^{−1}
- 3D model (JSmol): Interactive image
- SMILES: Clc1ccc(cc1Cl)[C@H](CCN3CCC(c2ccccc2)(NC(=O)C)CC3)CN(C(=O)c4ccccc4)C
- InChI: InChI=1S/C31H35Cl2N3O2/c1-23(37)34-31(27-11-7-4-8-12-27)16-19-36(20-17-31)18-15-26(25-13-14-28(32)29(33)21-25)22-35(2)30(38)24-9-5-3-6-10-24/h3-14,21,26H,15-20,22H2,1-2H3,(H,34,37)/t26-/m1/s1; Key:PGKXDIMONUAMFR-AREMUKBSSA-N

Saredutant (SR-48,968) is a drug that acts as a NK_{2} receptor antagonist. It was under development by Sanofi-Aventis as a novel antidepressant and anxiolytic and made it to phase III clinical trials. However, in May 2009, Sanofi-Aventis published its quarterly results and announced the cessation of 14 research/development projects, among which was saredutant for the treatment of major depressive disorder.

== See also ==
- GR-159,897
- Ibodutant
- Nepadutant
