= Tachykinin receptor 2 =

Protein-coding gene in the species Homo sapiens

TACR2

Identifiers
- Aliases: TACR2, NK2R, NKNAR, SKR, TAC2R, Tachykinin receptor 2
- External IDs: OMIM: 162321; MGI: 98477; GeneCards: TACR2

Gene location (Human)
Chr.	Chromosome 10 (human)
Band	10q22.1	Start	69,403,903 bp
Band	10q22.1	End	69,416,918 bp

Gene location (Mouse)
Chr.	Chromosome 10 (mouse)
Band	10|10 B4	Start	62,088,217 bp
Band	10|10 B4	End	62,101,769 bp
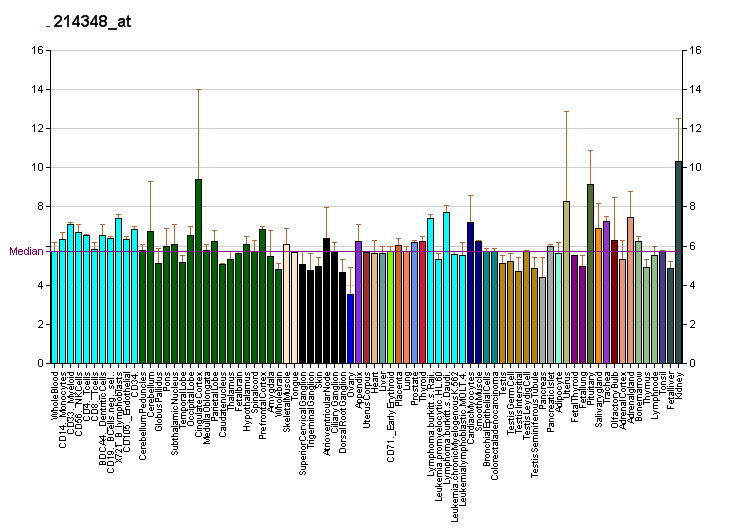
RNA expression pattern
Bgee	Human / Mouse (ortholog); Top expressed in: gastric mucosa; muscle layer of sigmoid colon; smooth muscle tissue; left uterine tube; epithelium of colon; testicle; body of uterus; transverse colon; fundus; myometrium / Top expressed in: adrenal gland; embryo; lumbar subsegment of spinal cord; right ventricle; stomach; gastrula; colon; vastus lateralis muscle; tibiofemoral joint; duodenum; More reference expression data
BioGPS	More reference expression data
Gene ontology
Molecular function	tachykinin receptor activity; G protein-coupled receptor activity; substance K receptor activity; signal transducer activity; protein binding
Cellular component	integral component of membrane; membrane; integral component of plasma membrane; sperm flagellum; sperm head; sperm midpiece; plasma membrane
Biological process	intestine smooth muscle contraction; positive regulation of acetylcholine secretion, neurotransmission; excretion; muscle contraction; negative regulation of luteinizing hormone secretion; prolactin secretion; operant conditioning; response to electrical stimulus; regulation of uterine smooth muscle contraction; positive regulation of vascular permeability; positive regulation of ion transport; positive regulation of smooth muscle contraction; signal transduction; positive regulation of uterine smooth muscle contraction; tachykinin receptor signaling pathway; chemical synaptic transmission; positive regulation of flagellated sperm motility; G protein-coupled receptor signaling pathway
Sources:Amigo / QuickGO
Orthologs
Databases	NCBI: entry; OMA: entry
Species	Human	Mouse
Entrez	6865	21337
Ensembl	ENSG00000075073	ENSMUSG00000020081
UniProt	P21452	P30549
RefSeq (mRNA)	NM_001057	NM_009314
RefSeq (protein)	NP_001048	NP_033340
Location (UCSC)	Chr 10: 69.4 – 69.42 Mb	Chr 10: 62.09 – 62.1 Mb
PubMed search
- Wikidata
View/Edit Human	View/Edit Mouse

Substance-K receptor is a protein that in humans is encoded by the TACR2 gene.

== Function ==
This gene belongs to a family of genes that function as receptors for tachykinins. Receptor affinities are specified by variations in the 5'-end of the sequence. The receptors belonging to this family are characterized by interactions with G proteins and 7 hydrophobic transmembrane regions. This gene encodes the receptor for the tachykinin neuropeptide substance K, also referred to as neurokinin A.

== Selective Ligands ==
Several selective ligands for NK_{2} are now available, and although most of the compounds developed so far are peptides, one small-molecule antagonist Saredutant is currently in clinical trials as an anxiolytic and antidepressant.

=== Agonists ===
- GR-64349 - potent and selective agonist, EC_{50} 3.7nM, 7-amino acid polypeptide chain. CAS# 137593-52-3

=== Antagonists ===
- Ibodutant - failed its Phase 3 trial for IBS treatment in 2015, and abandoned by Menarini
- Saredutant - mixed but mostly negative Phase 3 trial results in 2009, and abandoned by Sanofi-Aventis
- GR-159897
- Nepadutant
- MEN-10376 - potent and selective antagonist, 7-amino acid polypeptide chain. CAS# 135306-85-3

== See also ==
- Tachykinin receptor
