= TAC1 =

Protein-coding gene in humans

Identifiers
- Aliases: TAC1, Hs.2563, NK2, TAC2, tachykinin precursor 1, NKNA, NPK
- External IDs: OMIM: 162320; MGI: 98474; GeneCards: TAC1
Available structures
PDB	Ortholog search: PDBe RCSB
PDB	List of PDB id codes 2KS9, 2KSA, 2KSB, 4HOM,%%s2B19,%%s2B19

Gene location (Human)
Chr.	Chromosome 7 (human)
Band	7q21.3	Start	97,732,084 bp
Band	7q21.3	End	97,740,472 bp

Gene location (Mouse)
Chr.	Chromosome 6 (mouse)
Band	6 A1|6 3.31 cM	Start	7,554,879 bp
Band	6 A1|6 3.31 cM	End	7,565,834 bp
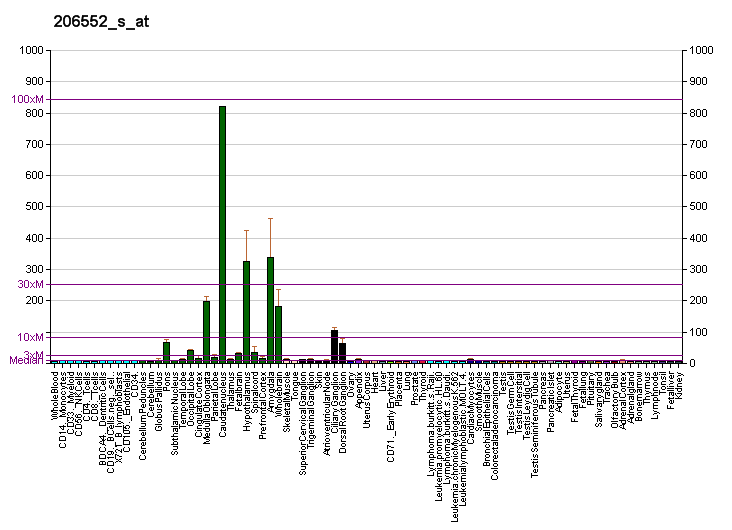
RNA expression pattern
Bgee	Human / Mouse (ortholog); Top expressed in: spinal ganglia; external globus pallidus; endothelial cell; putamen; dorsal motor nucleus of vagus nerve; caudate nucleus; nucleus accumbens; middle frontal gyrus; trigeminal ganglion; superior vestibular nucleus / Top expressed in: olfactory tubercle; nucleus accumbens; ventromedial nucleus; ventral tegmental area; dorsomedial hypothalamic nucleus; mammillary body; anterior amygdaloid area; globus pallidus; habenula; superior frontal gyrus; More reference expression data
BioGPS	More reference expression data
Gene ontology
Molecular function	protein binding; signaling receptor binding; substance P receptor binding
Cellular component	plasma membrane; extracellular region; axon; soma; extracellular space
Biological process	cellular response to nerve growth factor stimulus; response to yeast; associative learning; positive regulation of renal sodium excretion; positive regulation of cytosolic calcium ion concentration; cell-cell signaling; antibacterial humoral response; positive regulation of synaptic transmission, cholinergic; positive regulation of epithelial cell migration; positive regulation of ossification; positive regulation of synaptic transmission, GABAergic; negative regulation of heart rate; positive regulation of corticosterone secretion; regulation of blood pressure; positive regulation of action potential; response to morphine; response to lipopolysaccharide; long-term memory; response to pain; defense response to Gram-negative bacterium; positive regulation of saliva secretion; positive regulation of acute inflammatory response; insemination; response to hormone; sensory perception of pain; detection of abiotic stimulus; innate immune response; neuropeptide signaling pathway; positive regulation of lymphocyte proliferation; positive regulation of stress fiber assembly; antifungal humoral response; defense response to Gram-positive bacterium; chemical synaptic transmission; inflammatory response; tachykinin receptor signaling pathway; antimicrobial humoral immune response mediated by antimicrobial peptide; killing of cells of other organism; G protein-coupled receptor signaling pathway
Sources:Amigo / QuickGO
Orthologs
Databases	NCBI: entry; OMA: entry
Species	Human	Mouse
Entrez	6863	21333
Ensembl	ENSG00000006128	ENSMUSG00000061762
UniProt	P20366	P41539
RefSeq (mRNA)	NM_013998; NM_003182; NM_013996; NM_013997	NM_009311; NM_001311060
RefSeq (protein)	NP_003173; NP_054702; NP_054703; NP_054704	NP_001297989; NP_033337
Location (UCSC)	Chr 7: 97.73 – 97.74 Mb	Chr 6: 7.55 – 7.57 Mb
PubMed search
- Wikidata
View/Edit Human	View/Edit Mouse

Preprotachykinin-1, (abbreviated PPT-1, PPT-I, or PPT-A), is a protein that in humans is encoded by the TAC1 gene. It is a precursor protein that can be cut into a number of smaller peptide hormones including substance P and neurokinin A.

== Function ==
The hormones derived from PPT-1 function as neurotransmitters which interact with nerve receptors and smooth muscle cells. They are known to induce behavioral responses and function as vasodilators and secretagogues.

== Isoforms and derivatives ==
The protein has four isoforms—alpha-, beta-, gamma-, and delta-PPT—which can variably undergo post-translational modification to produce neurokinin A (formerly known as substance K) and substance P. Alpha- and delta-PPT can only be modified to substance P, whereas beta- and gamma-PPT can produce both substance P and neurokinin A. Other produced derivates include neurokinin K and neuropeptide gamma.

=== Substance P ===

Substance P is a hormone corresponding to positions 58-68 of preprotachykinin-1. It is released from certain sensory nerves and promotes an inflammatory response that can sensitize pain receptors. It functions through its activation of the receptors TACR1 (G_{q}- and G_{s}-type effects) and MRGPRX2. It can also activate TACR3, though it has low affinity.

=== Neurokinin A ===
Neurokinin A (also called substance K) is a signaling molecule corresponding to positions 98-107 of Preprotachykinin-1. It activates the TACR2 receptor, which causes a G_{q}-type response.

=== Neuropeptide K ===
Neuropeptide K (not to be confused with substance K) is a neurokinin A-like peptide which comes from the beta isoform of PPT-1, and corresponds to positions 72-107 of the (canonical) PPT-1 sequence. In rats, neuropeptide K may interact synergistically with substance P to stimulate saliva release. However, unlike in rats, the main human saliva glands are not innervated by substance P nerves.

=== Neuropeptide gamma ===
Neuropeptide gamma is a neurokinin A-like peptide coming from cleavage of the gamma isoform of PPT-1. It corresponds to positions 72-73 and 89-107 of the (canonical) PPT-1 sequence.

== Human basal ganglia ==
The nature and distribution of PPT-1 has been studied in the human basal ganglia. The protein is expressed evenly throughout the caudate and putamen, and 80 to 85% of it exists in the beta-PPT isoform. 15-20% of the protein is in the gamma-PPT isoform, while no alpha-PPT was detected at all.

== Species comparison ==
In humans, beta-PPT is the dominant isoform in the brain, which contrasts with rats (predominantly gamma-PPT) and cows (alpha-PPT).

While both human and rat PPT-1 produce substance P and neurokinin A, humans produce more neuropeptide K, whereas rats produce more neuropeptide gamma. In cow brains, PPT-1 primarily encodes substance P, but not other neurokinin A-derived peptides.

== See also ==
- TAC3
- Tachykinin peptides
- Tachykinin receptors
