= Menarini =

Italian pharmaceutical company

A. Menarini Industrie Farmaceutiche Riunite
- Type: Limited liability company
- Industry: Pharmaceutical; Health care and diagnostics
- Founded: 1886 in Naples
- Founder: Archimede Menarini
- Headquarters: Florence, Italy
- Area served: Worldwide
- Key people: Lucia Aleotti, Alberto Giovanni Aleotti (shareholders and board members); Eric Cornut (President); Elcin Barker Ergun (CEO and board member); Carlo Colombini, Thomas Cueni (board members)
- Revenue: € 4.88 billion (2025)
- Number of employees: 17,800 (2025)
- Website: https://www.menarini.com/

The Menarini Group is an Italian pharmaceutical company. Its headquarters is in Florence, Tuscany, and it has three divisions: Menarini Ricerche, Menarini Biotech, and Menarini Diagnostics. It develops pharmacological solutions for cardiovascular diseases, oncology, pain/inflammation, asthma and anti-infectives. Menarini's research activities are carried out through Menarini Ricerche, which deals with all R&D activities, from the creation of new projects to drug registration. Its Menarini Biotech follows the creation of a biotechnological drug from the very early stages of research, through to the pilot scale and up to industrial production. The Group's Menarini Diagnostics division is a healthcare company with a worldwide network of affiliates partners and distributors focused on diabetes, haematology, clinical chemistry, urinalysis, and immunology. In 2025, the company had 17,800 employees worldwide.

Massimiliana Landini Aleotti and her three children inherited the company, valued at US$11.6 billion, following the death of her husband in May 2014.

== History ==
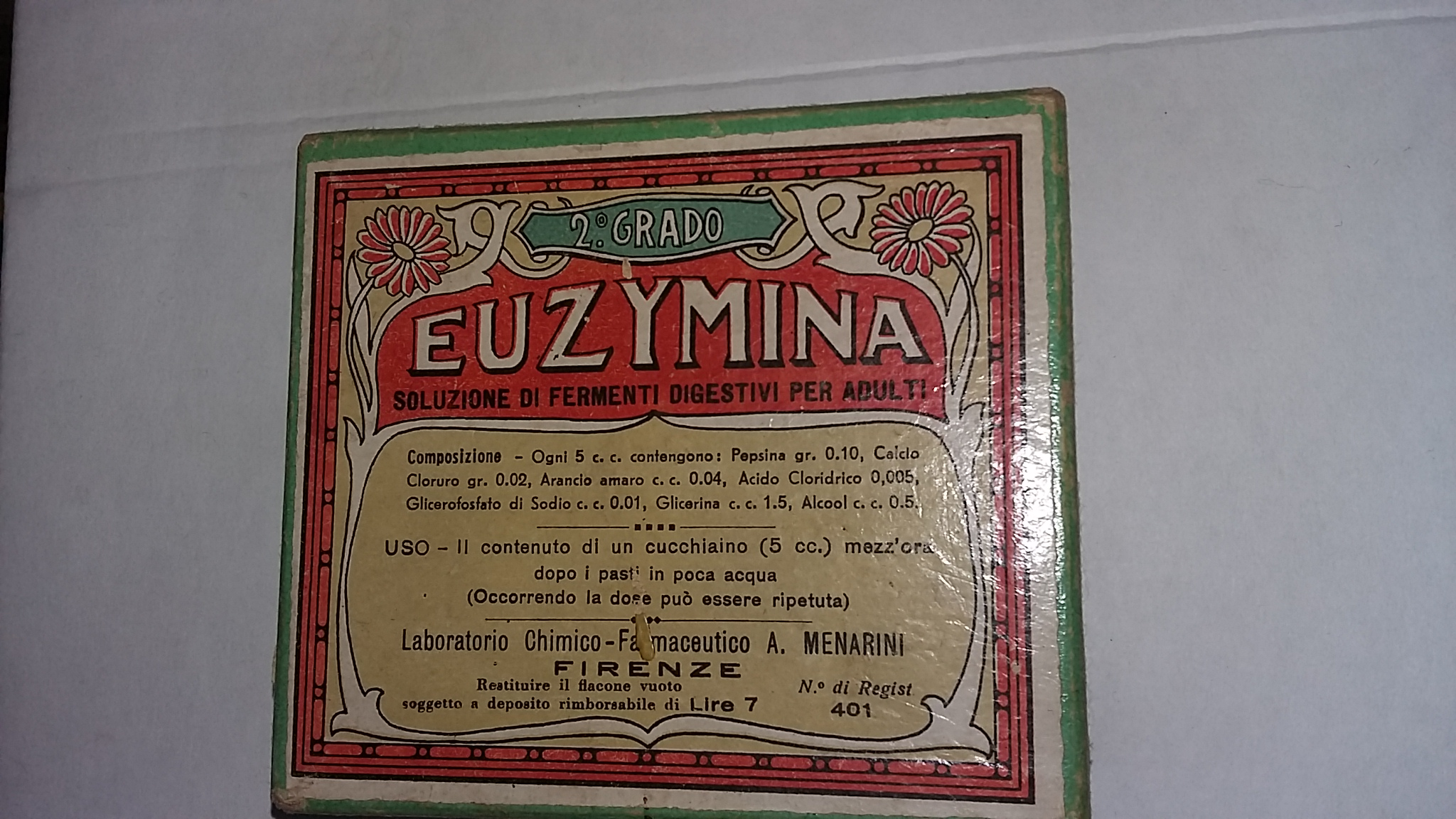
Detail of a pack of Euzymina

Menarini was founded in 1886 in the small laboratory of the Farmacia Internazionale in Naples, founded by Doctor Archimede Menarini. Alongside its regular galenic production, the first medicines distributed under the Menarini brand were soon introduced: Metarsile, a restorative based on iron phospho-methylarsinate, produced until the 1960s, and Euzymina, a solution of digestive ferments with lecithin indicated for the treatment of digestive disorders. In 1915, the business was moved from Naples to Florence, due to its proximity to numerous glassworks.

In the 1960s, it acquired the Spanish laboratory Puig Sala, now Laboratorios Menarini, founded in 1924 in Barcelona. In 1972 the headquarters moved from Barcelona to Badalona, expanding the facilities to 15,000 m². Menarini Spain and its subsidiaries in Central America and the Caribbean focus on research and development of medicines for cardiovascular diseases, anti-inflammatory drugs and pain relief.

In 1976, Menarini Diagnostics was established, specialising in self-monitoring systems for glucose and in laboratory analysis. The division initially operated only in Italy as a distributor of laboratory systems; in the 1980s it opened a technology department with a quality control laboratory and its first production facility. From 1984 onwards, self-monitoring systems for diabetes were added to its laboratory instrumentation. In 1976, the Fondazione Internazionale Menarini was also established to promote research and knowledge in the fields of biology, pharmacology and medicine, economics and the humanities, and it organises international congresses with particular attention to medical disciplines.

In 1978, the Menarini Group acquired Malesci, a Florentine pharmaceutical company founded in 1850.

In 1982, the first affiliate in Central America and the Caribbean was established. The headquarters is located in Guatemala, where a production plant operates.

Between 1983 and 1984, the company acquired Guidotti of Pisa, Lusofarmaco of Milan and FIRMA. In 1992, the German company Berlin Chemie (founded in 1890) joined the group, opening up a new market in Central and Eastern Europe. In the same year, the Menarini France subsidiary was established. The Research Toxicology Center (RTC) was founded in 1987 in Pomezia, followed in 1992 by the Menarini Research Campus and in 2003 by the Menarini Biotech biotechnology plant.

In 1993, the L'Aquila plant was inaugurated. In 1994, Menarini entered the Indian market through a partnership with Raunaq Industries and in the same year opened its OTC (over-the-counter medicines) division, followed in 2001 by the acquisition of IE Ulagay, a former Turkish laboratory founded in 1903, and the establishment of its affiliate in Argentina, with a quality control laboratory in Buenos Aires.

In 2006, the Menarini-von Heyden production plant was inaugurated in Dresden and in 2008 the Menarini Mexico affiliate was established. In 2011, Invida was acquired and became Menarini Asia-Pacific, with a presence in numerous South Asian countries.

In 2013, the Italian start-up Silicon Biosystems, winner of the 2012 "Premio Leonardo", specialising in rare cell research down to single-cell precision, was acquired and became Menarini Silicon Biosystems. The latter subsequently acquired all corporate activities related to the CellSearch system.

In 2014, Menarini Biomarkers was established for the research and development of biomarkers for prenatal diagnosis without amniocentesis, as well as in the field of lung and ocular cancers. In the same year, the group opened a new pharmaceutical production plant in Kaluga (Russian Federation).

In March 2018, the company announced the appointment of a new board of directors, marking the first time that an external manager, Eric Cornut, had taken on the role of chairman. Cornut, a Swiss national from Basel with a master's degree obtained in California, spent 20 years at Novartis and for two years, until April 2017, served as Director General of the EFPIA (European Federation of Pharmaceutical Industries and Associations). On 12 September 2019, the board of directors appointed Elcin Barker Ergun as chief executive officer of the company.

In 2020, Menarini developed a rapid COVID-19 test amid the COVID-19 pandemic in Italy, capable of giving a result in just 20 minutes. The same year the group acquired Stemline Therapeutics, a United States-based biopharmaceutical company then listed on the Nasdaq, specialising in the development of innovative oncology therapies. As of 2025, Menarini Stemline has obtained approval from the main regulatory authorities worldwide for three oncology drugs.

== Operations ==
=== Research and development ===
The group is involved in the entire drug development cycle, from the initial design of new projects to their authorization and commercialization. Programs developed across the group’s nine research centers focus on cardiovascular diseases, oncology, and infectious diseases.

Since 1986, Menarini has operated in the field of biotechnology in Italy at its Pomezia site.

=== Production ===
The Menarini Group operates 18 manufacturing plants worldwide: two facilities in Florence (Florence–Sette Santi and Florence–Scandicci), two in Pisa (Lusochimica and Menarini Manufacturing), Lomagna, Casaletto Lodigiano, L'Aquila, Badalona (Spain), two facilities in Berlin, Dresden, Topkapı – Istanbul, Shannon (Ireland), Jakarta, Kaluga (Russia), and Guatemala City.

In 2024, the group produced a total of 609 million units.

=== Diagnostics ===
The group’s subsidiary Menarini Diagnostics specializes in the production of glucose self-monitoring sensors, reagents, and laboratory diagnostics. The company operates internationally.

=== Distribution network ===
As of 2025, through direct subsidiaries and local distributors, Menarini operates in 140 countries.

== Financial data ==
In 2025, the company's revenue totaled 4.88 billion euros, representing a 6.2% increase compared to 2024. At the end of the year, the group had 17,800 employees.

== Fair Play Menarini International Award ==
Since 2011, Menarini has been the title sponsor of the Fair Play Menarini International Award, which since 1997 has recognised acts of loyalty and fairness performed by leading figures in sport. Since 2021, the award has been organised independently by Menarini through the Fair Play Menarini Foundation. Each year, the athletes and sports figures who receive the award become Fair Play Menarini ambassadors, serving as symbols of sporting achievements carried out in the spirit of fair play and respect for the rules.

== Social causes ==
=== Pediatricians network against child abuse ===
"Paediatric network against ill-treatment of minors" has been launched and supported by the pharmaceutical company, Menarini, together with it:Telefono Azzurro, the Italian Federation of Paediatricians, and the Association of Italian Paediatric Hospitals, has grown beyond Italian borders.

The project originated in Italy and is the first of its kind in the world. It was launched in May 2016 in the city of Florence and is supported by Menarini with an investment of one million euro. It foresees the creation of a network of 15,000 paediatricians and general practitioners deployed over the entire Italian territory who act as 'sentinels' in the fight against child abuse. These physicians, who have been 'trained' on the skills needed to recognise the unexpressed 'sentinel' warning signs of child abuse, shall in turn become reference people for their colleagues on a local level, providing qualified information and advice. This project is for the creation of an anti-abuse network.

On 18 October 2016 the project was presented in Tirana to more than 500 paediatricians, not only from the Balkans but also from other countries such as Romania, Switzerland, Turkey and others.

=== Social housing renovation project ===
The Menarini pharmaceutical group is committed to the recovery of several social housing owned by the municipality of Florence. So far the apartments recovered are 20 and have been assigned to families of small and medium size. The surfaces of the delivered housing range from 50 to 70 square metres each. The first agreement between the Menarini Group and the City of Florence was presented on 16 July 2013 by the mayor of Florence, Matteo Renzi and Lucia Aleotti, President of the Menarini pharmaceutical group.

On 18 January 2014 the Menarini Group has delivered the first three of 10 apartments, located in Via Rocca Tedalda, in the south side of Florence.

On 27 March 2014, the keys of the last 7 houses of the first edition of the project were delivered.

On 12 December 2014 it was announced the second edition of the project of social housing redevelopment in Palazzo Vecchio by Mayor Dario Nardella, the President and the vice-chairman of the pharmaceutical group Menarini Lucia and Alberto Giovanni Aleotti.

On 21 April 2015, 10 apartments renovated from Menarini were delivered to 10 needy families in the city.

On 30 November 2015 it was announced the third edition of the project.

On 17 June 2016 the Menarini Group and the City of Florence have handed over the keys of 10 renovated houses to those families included in the social rankings of the city.

== Criticism ==
The Menarini Group continued its operations in Russia despite the international sanctions imposed following Russia's invasion of Ukraine. The company faced criticism from organizations promoting corporate accountability and ethical practices in regions affected by geopolitical conflicts.

== See also ==
- Dexketoprofen
- Ibodutant
- Berlin Chemie

== Publications ==
- "Handling with missing data in clinical trials for time-to-event variables" (PDF). PharmaSUG. SP02: 1–9. 2014.
- "Ranolazine Reduces The Late Recurrences Of Atrial Fibrillation. An Exploratory Analysis Of The Raffaello Study". Treatment of Arrhythmias: Pharmacological-atrial Fibrillation. 130. November 2014.
- "MEN1112, a Novel Humanized De-Fucosylated Monoclonal Antibody with High Affinity and Specificity for Bst1/CD157 Antigen and Enhanced CD16 Binding". 56th ASH Annual Meeting and Exposition, S. Francisco (CA). 124: 3607. December 2014.
- "Targeting and Depletion of Acute Myeloid Leukemia Blasts By MEN1112, a Novel Humanized Defucosylated Monoclonal Antibodies with Specificity for Bst1/CD157 Antigen". 56th ASH Annual Meeting and Exposition, S. Francisco (CA). 124: 2235. December 2014.
- "Prophylaxis with Febuxostat in comparison to Allopurinol reduces exposure to uric acid in patients at intermediate to high risk of tumor lysis syndrome: results of the Florence study". 19th Congress of the European Hematology Association, Milano. June 2014.
- Baldini, Simone; Rossi, Cristina; Spina, Michele; Federico, Massimo; Nagy, Zsolt; Jordan, Karin; Aurer, Igor; Ribera, Josep-Maria; Borsaru, Gabriela; Glushko, Nataliia; Grosicki, Sebastian; Pristupa, Alexander; Bosi, Alberto; Rego, Eduardo M.; Nizzardo, Andrea; Scartoni, Simona; Scordari, Alessandra; Matera, Mariagiuseppa; Maggi, Carlo Alberto; Capriati, Angela; Simonelli, Cecilia (December 2014). "Decision Driven Factors for Allopurinol Dosage in Tumor Lysis Syndrome Prophylaxis: The European Experience of the Florence Pivotal Study". Blood. 124 (21): 5979. doi:10.1182/blood.V124.21.5979.5979.
- "A randomized double-blind phase III pivotal study of febuxostat (FEB) versus allopurinol (ALL) in the prevention of tumor lysis syndrome (TLS): Florence study". Clin Oncol. 32. June 2014.
- Tack, Jan F.; Capriati, Angela; Schumacher, Kai; Ligas, Franca; Ott, Kerstin; Tonini, Giulia; Scartoni, Simona; Otranto, Isabella; Nuti, Alessandra; Maggi, Carlo Alberto (May 2014). "Sa1080 Concordance Among Outcome Variables Assessing the Response to Treatment With Ibodutant in Irritable Bowel Syndrome With Diarrhea (IBS-D; the IRIS-2 Study)". Gastroenterology. 146 (5): 194. doi:10.1016/s0016-5085(14)60684-3.
- Oliveras, A; Armario, P; Lucas, S; de la Sierra, A (March 2014). "Blood pressure control is similar in treated hypertensive patients with optimal or with high-normal albuminuria". American Journal of Hypertension. 27 (9): 1185–1190. doi:10.1093/ajh/hpu039. PMID 24646879.
- Ceriotti, F; Kaczmarek, E; Guerra, E; Mastrantonio, F; Lucarelli, F; Valgimigli, F; Mosca, A (December 2014). "Comparative Performance Assessment of Point-of-Care Testing Devices for Measuring Glucose and Ketones at the Patient Bedside". Journal of Diabetes Science and Technology. 9 (2): 268–77. doi:10.1177/1932296814563351. PMC 4604596. PMID 25519295.
- Allais, G; Tullo, V; Cortelli, P; Barbanti, P; Valguarnera, F; Sette, G; D'Onofrio, F; Curone, M; Zava, D; Pezzola, D; Reggiardo, G; Omboni, S; Frediani, F; Bussone, G; Benedetto, C (May 2014). "EHMTI-0052. Efficacy of early vs. late use of frovatriptan combined with dexketoprofen vs. frovatriptan alone in the acute treatment of migraine attacks with or without aura". The Journal of Headache and Pain. 35 (1): 107–113. doi:10.1007/s10072-014-1751-3. PMC 4035546. PMID 24867846.
- Bucci, M; Vellecco, V; Cantalupo, A; Brancaleone, V; Zhou, Z; Evangelista, S; Calderone, V; Papapetropoulos, A; Cirino, G (February 2014). "Hydrogen sulfide accounts for the peripheral vascular effects of zofenopril independently of ACE inhibition". Cardiovascular Research. 102 (1): 138–147. doi:10.1093/cvr/cvu026. PMID 24501330.
- Momi, S; Caracchini, R; Falcinelli, E; Evangelista, S; Gresele, P (February 2014). "Stimulation of platelet nitric oxide production by nebivolol prevents thrombosis". Arteriosclerosis, Thrombosis, and Vascular Biology. 34 (4): 820–829. doi:10.1161/atvbaha.114.303290. PMID 24558107.
- Mainardi, F; Maggioni, F; Pezzola, D; Zava, D; Zanchin, G (January 2014). "Dexketoprofen trometamol in the acute treatment of migraine attack: a phase II, randomized, double-blind, crossover, placebo-controlled, dose optimization study". The Journal of Pain. 333 (4): 388–394. doi:10.1016/j.jpain.2013.12.006. hdl:11577/3178223. PMID 24412801.
- Agabiti-Rosei, E; Manolis, A; Zava, D; Omboni, S (January 2014). "Zofenopril plus hydrochlorothiazide and irbesartan plus hydrochlorothiazide in previously treated and uncontrolled diabetic and non-diabetic essential hypertensive patients". Advances in Therapy. 31 (2): 217–233. doi:10.1007/s12325-013-0090-8. PMC 3930838. PMID 24415271.
- Tullo, V; Valguarnera, F; Barbanti, P; Cortelli, P; Sette, G; Allais, G; d'Onofrio, F; Curone, M; Zava, D; Pezzola, D; Benedetto, C; Frediani, F; Bussone, G (December 2013). "Comparison of frovatriptan plus dexketoprofen (25 mg or 37.5 mg) with frovatriptan alone in the treatment of migraine attacks with or without aura: a randomized study". Cephalalgia. 34 (6): 434–445. doi:10.1177/0333102413515342. PMID 24363238.
- Saracco, MG; Allais, G; Tullo, V; Zava, D; Pezzola, D; Reggiardo, G; Omboni, S; Benedetto, C; Bussone, G; Aguggia, M (May 2014). "Efficacy of frovatriptan and other triptans in the treatment of acute migraine of normal weight and obese subjects: a review of randomized studies". Neurological Sciences. 35 (1): 115–119. doi:10.1007/s10072-014-1752-2. PMID 24867847. S2CID 20224729.
- Traini, C; Faussone-Pellegrini, MS; Evangelista, S; Mazzaferro, K; Cipriani, G; Santicioli, P; Vannucchi, MG (January 2015). "Inner and outer portions of colonic circular muscle: ultrastructural and immunohistochemical changes in rat chronically treated with otilonium bromide". PLOS ONE. 9 (8) e103237. doi:10.1371/journal.pone.0103237. PMC 4133200. PMID 25122192.
- Terzuoli, E; Meini, S; Cucchi, P; Catalani, C; Cialdai, C; Maggi, CA; Giachetti, A; Ziche, M; Donnini, S (January 2014). "Antagonism of bradykinin B2 receptor prevents inflammatory responses in human endothelial cells by quenching the NF-kB pathway activation". PLOS ONE. 9 (1) e84358. Bibcode:2014PLoSO...984358T. doi:10.1371/journal.pone.0084358. PMC 3879294. PMID 24392129.
