= Elcin Barker Ergun =

Elcin Barker Ergun is a business leader in the pharmaceutical industry. In September 2019 she was appointed chief executive officer and member of the board of directors of the Italian company Menarini Group.

== Biography ==
Ergun graduated from TED Ankara College (high school) in Turkey, where she also played basketball and handball and was a member of the team that won the national championship three times. Elcin has a Bachelor of Science degree in computer engineering from Middle East Technical University in Ankara and an MBA from INSEAD (Institut Europeen d’Administration Des Affaires).

Ergun's career started as a software engineer, working for five years in IT management in Amsterdam for ITT Corporation. After her MBA in France, Ergun moved to the UK, leading marketing and supply chain projects at the Northern European head office of Honeywell and later continued as subsidiary chief financial officer. Ergun entered the pharmaceutical industry as chief financial officer of the Turkish subsidiary of GlaxoSmithKline.

After joining Merck KGaA's Healthcare business, Elcin took on roles of increasing seniority within the organisation becoming Executive Vice President and Head of Global Commercial for Merck Serono, achieving significant leadership and business transformation across global commercial operations. This followed her role as Senior Vice President and Head of Intercontinental Region, across the Middle East, Africa, and Russia/CIS countries.

Before she joined Menarini Group, Elcin was based in Boston for three years as Executive Vice President, Head of New Businesses at Merck Healthcare.

Under Ergun's leadership, Menarini has accomplished milestones such as the 2020 acquisition of Stemline Therapeutics, a U.S. commercial-stage biopharmaceutical company, formerly a public listed organization quoted on NASDAQ, focused on the development and commercialization of novel oncology therapeutics. As of 2025, the portfolio of Menarini Stemline, a wholly owned subsidiary of the Menarini Group, includes 3 oncology and onco-hematology products.

In December 2023, the Menarini Group signed an exclusive licensing agreement with Insilico Medicine, a biotech company specializing in generative AI. The partnership grants Menarini global rights to develop and commercialize a small molecule inhibitor of KAT6, aimed at treating hormone-sensitive tumors and other potential therapeutic areas. In December 2024, the Menarini Group and Insilico Medicine concluded a second exclusive licensing agreement. This partnership grants the Menarini Group global rights to develop and commercialize a preclinical molecule targeting an oncological area with a significant need for innovative therapeutic solutions.
